= Renaissance art in Bergamo and Brescia =

Aspects of Renaissance art and culture in Bergamo and Brescia

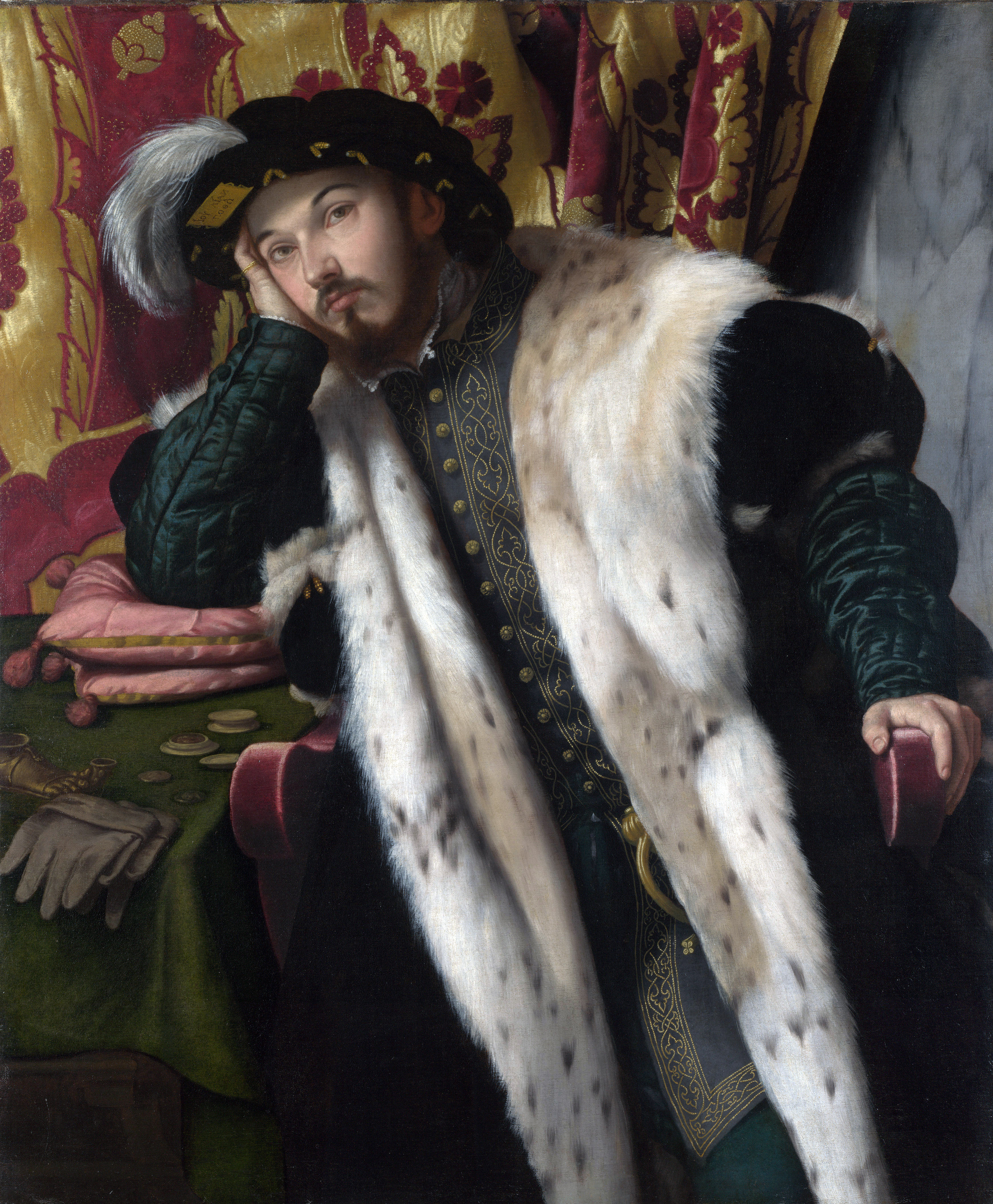
Moretto, Portrait of Fortunato Martinengo Cesaresco (1542)

The Bergamasque and Brescian Renaissance is one of the main variations of Renaissance art in Italy. The importance of the two cities on the art scene only expanded from the 16th century onward, when foreign and local artists gave rise to an original synthesis of Lombard and Venetian modes, due in part to the two cities' particular geographical position: the last outpost of the Serenissima on the mainland for Bergamo and a disputed territory between Milan (and its rulers) and Venice for Brescia.

The masters from Bergamo and Brescia were at the origin of a "third way" of late Renaissance, after the Roman-Florentine and the Venetian ones, which was of fundamental importance since it was at the basis of the later developments of the revolutionary language of Caravaggio, who was a native of those very areas.

== Origins ==
Bergamo and Brescia saw in the 15th century a significance in the Italian art scene that can be described as "satellite" compared to centers such as Milan and Venice. It was due to Francesco Sforza that Filarete worked in Bergamo (in the cathedral, c. 1455), and even a masterpiece like Giovanni Antonio Amadeo's Colleoni Chapel (1470-1476) is unthinkable outside the context of Sforza commissions of the time, such as the Milan Cathedral and, above all, the Certosa di Pavia, from which he drew Renaissance cues.

At the beginning of the sixteenth century Brescia represented an island compared to the Leonardism and Bramantism reigning in Milan, so much so that it was chosen as a refuge by Vincenzo Foppa, a Lombard artist of the "first generation" of the Renaissance.

The milestones of the local Renaissance were concentrated in the second and third decades of the sixteenth century: the meeting of Romanino and Titian in Padua in 1511, the arrival of Lorenzo Lotto in Bergamo in 1513, the relocation of Savoldo to Venice in about 1520, and the arrival in Brescia of Titian's Averoldi Polyptych in 1522.

== Lotto in Bergamo ==
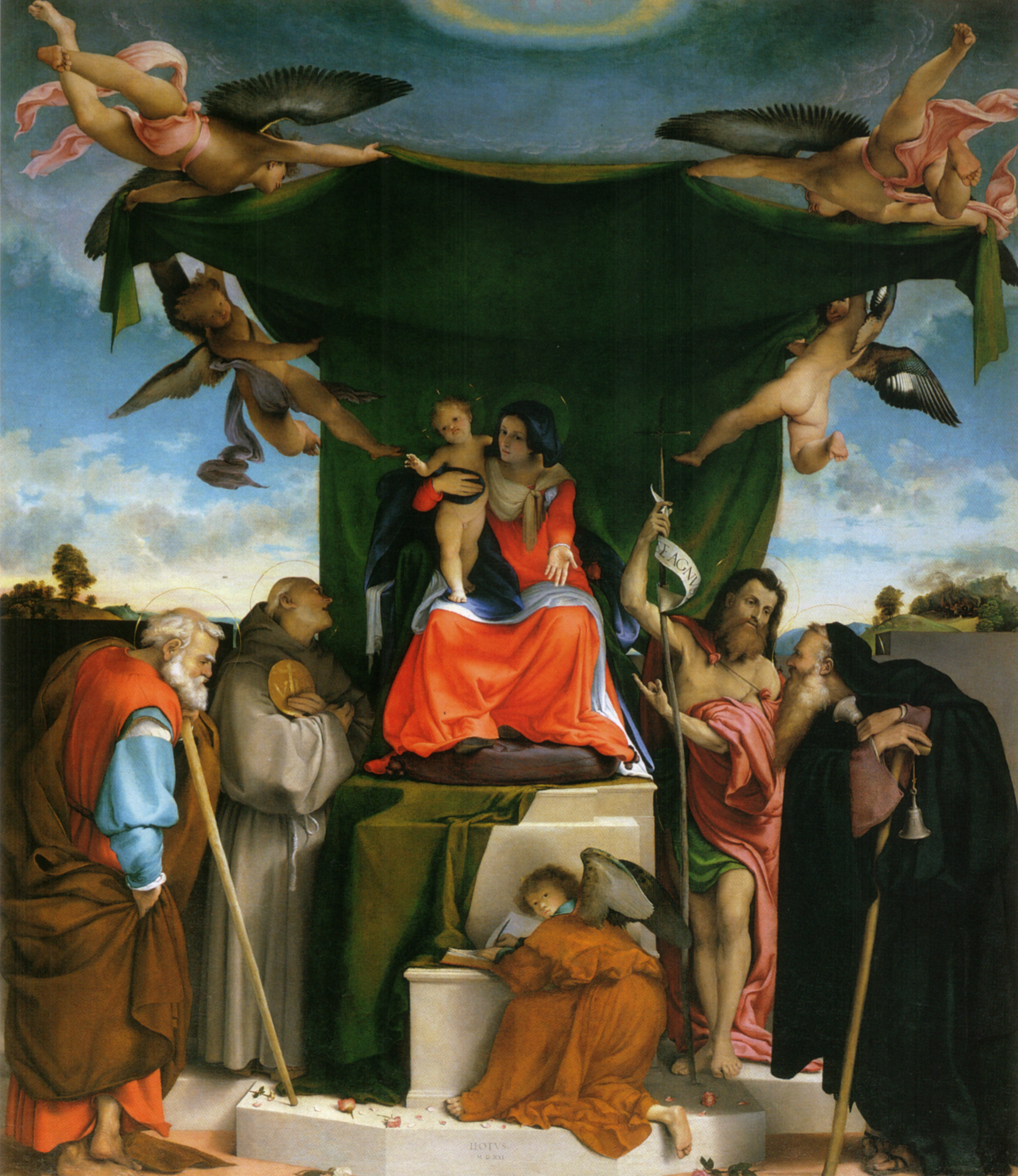
Lotto, San Bernardino Altarpiece (1521)

A quantum leap then occurred in Bergamo when Giovanni Cariani, a native of Bergamo but resident in Venice, (since 1517) and, above all, Lorenzo Lotto settled there. The latter arrived in 1513 to paint the large altarpiece, Martinengo for the church of Santo Stefano. The provincial environment allowed him to move freely according to the inclinations of his own style, without adapting to the magniloquent modes of the "modern style" of the Roman Renaissance. In Bergamo, supported by a cultured and wealthy patronage, he was able to gather the influences most suited to him, freeing himself from the language dominant in the more important centers of the peninsula. To his never-forgotten Venetian roots he could add cues from Gaudenzio Ferrari, the young Correggio, Nordic art and the local Lombard influence.

The Martinengo Altarpiece (1513-1516) already showed some bold innovations, such as the arrangement of the throne of Mary and the saints with a church nave behind them (and not an apse as was typical), the dome open to the sky (a reference to Mantegna), the intense characterization of the characters and the vibrant light, which generate an unstable effect in the scene.

The later San Bernardino Altarpiece (1521) shows a very bright palette, a modern treatment of shadows and a dizzying foreshortening of the angels, as well as a sense of perception of the viewer's presence by Mary and, especially the angel at the foot of the throne, who interrupts the scene by turning around in surprise.

In addition to the fresco cycles rich in iconographic novelties, such as that of the Suardi Chapel in Trescore Balneario, and besides the intense and close portraits, it was above all the ambitious project of the inlays of the choir of Santa Maria Maggiore that kept him busy until his departure in 1526. A dispute over payment with the friars then kept him always away from the city, to which he never returned despite having spent the most fruitful time of his career there.

== The Renaissance in Brescia ==
=== The beginnings ===
The very first, vague hints of a new decorative and compositional style that surpassed the International Gothic were to be found, in the field of painting, in some "top-down" works in medieval fifteenth-century Brescia, primarily Antonio Vivarini's polyptych of Saint Ursula for the church of San Pietro in Oliveto. The work had notable influences on local art, found, for example, in the evolution of Paolo da Caylina the Elder's art toward fuller forms, as in the Madonna and Child between Saints Lawrence and Augustine, which, painted after the arrival of Vivarini's polyptych, displays precisely these features.

Another "top-down" proto-Renaissance work in 15th-century Brescia was Jacopo Bellini's Annunciation painted for the church of Sant'Alessandro, faithful to the language of International Gothic but with relative novelties in the spatial conception and stance of the figures.

Other movements in this direction can be seen in sporadic works produced by the local culture in the second half of the century, such as the large panel of Saint George and the Princess attributed to Antonio Cicognara or a master related to him, where the aristocratic Gothic stylistic features imported to Brescia by Gentile da Fabriano in the lost chapel of San Giorgio al Broletto evolve toward new spatial and luministic proportions.

=== Vincenzo Foppa ===
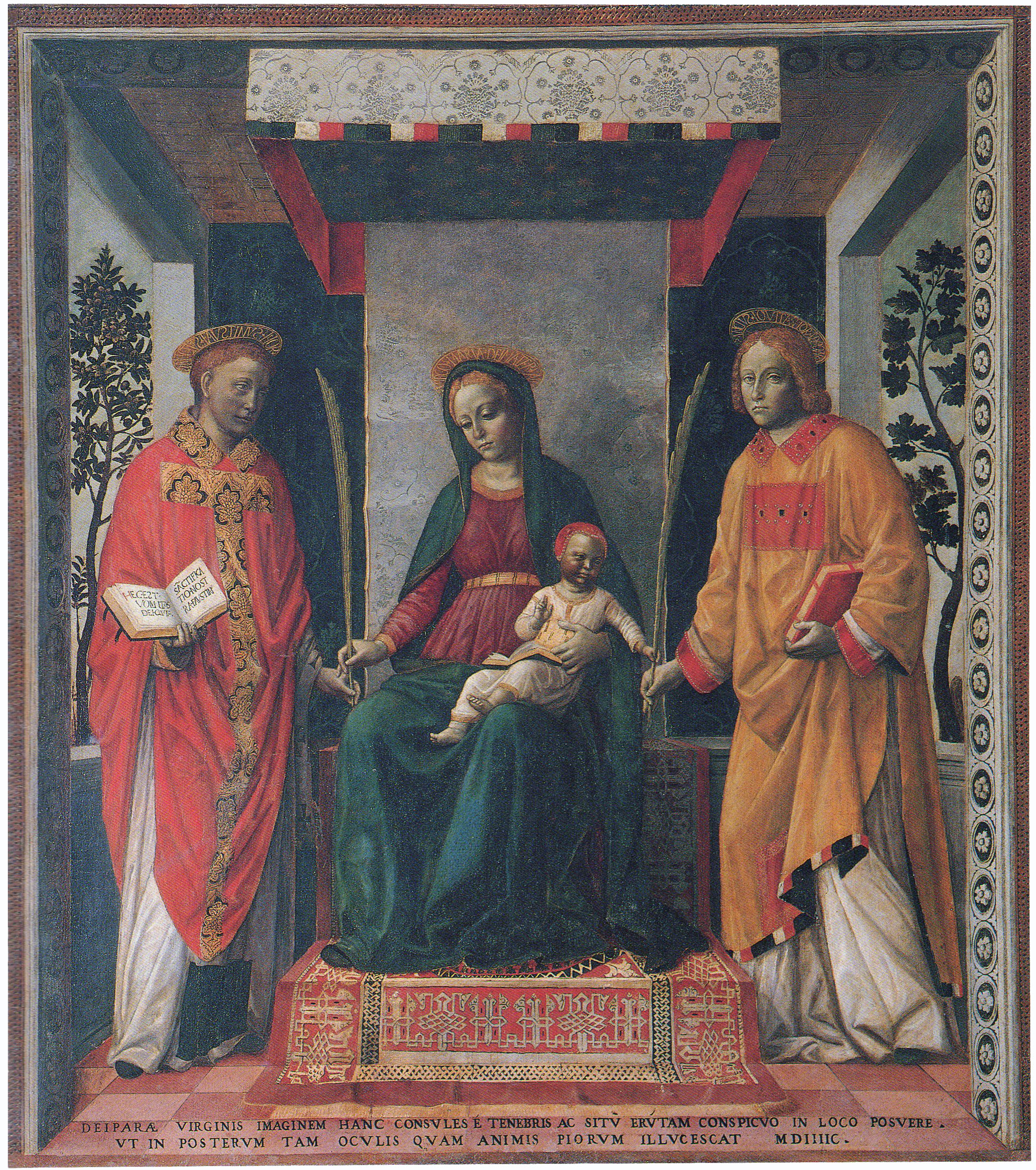
Vincenzo Foppa, Pala della Mercanzia, early 16th century

The first Renaissance author on the Brescian scene, the founder of the Brescian school, but also of the entire Lombard context, was Vincenzo Foppa, who worked in the city only after he moved there permanently, in 1489, until his death in about 1515.

The works he produced in this short period, not all of which have come down to us, demonstrate a general reworking of his artistic language in the light of the increasingly pressing Renaissance innovations, derived primarily from Leonardo da Vinci's teachings, while remaining faithful to his characteristic "archaizing" style. Thus one finds the Pala della Mercanzia, conceived in an iron will for linear and luminous absoluteness: the resulting trepid and yet rarefied reality would constitute a crucial lesson for Moretto. From the same period is the polyptych from which comes the Nativity of Jesus at Chiesanuova, painted precisely in this spirit of reworking. In the Stendardo di Orzinuovi, a last work painted by the almost 90-year-old Foppa, humanity and nature are defined in a stern and monumental language, while the various figures are charged with an expressive intensity imbued with physicality: this true "pictorial testament" would also constitute a solid starting point for Moretto and a clear reference for Savoldo, who was already working at the time.

Upon his return to Brescia, Foppa obtained, as an ultimate recognition from the city's General Council, the entrustment of a regular art course to instruct local youths, for an annual stipend of 100 lire.

=== The "intermediate generation" ===
Vincenzo Foppa and Moretto constitute the two cornerstones of Brescian Renaissance painting, and it was the latter who would eventually become the major exponent of the local school. However, in order to fully understand the development of Brescian Renaissance art, it is not possible to overlook what is usually referred to as the "intermediate generation," that is, a number of painters who worked between the end of the fifteenth century and the first thirty years of the sixteenth century (exactly between Foppa and the maturity of Moretto), producing a series of works of high artistic merit developed within a local culture influenced mainly by Foppa, an environment that would prove no stranger to the formation and subsequent establishment of the great masters.

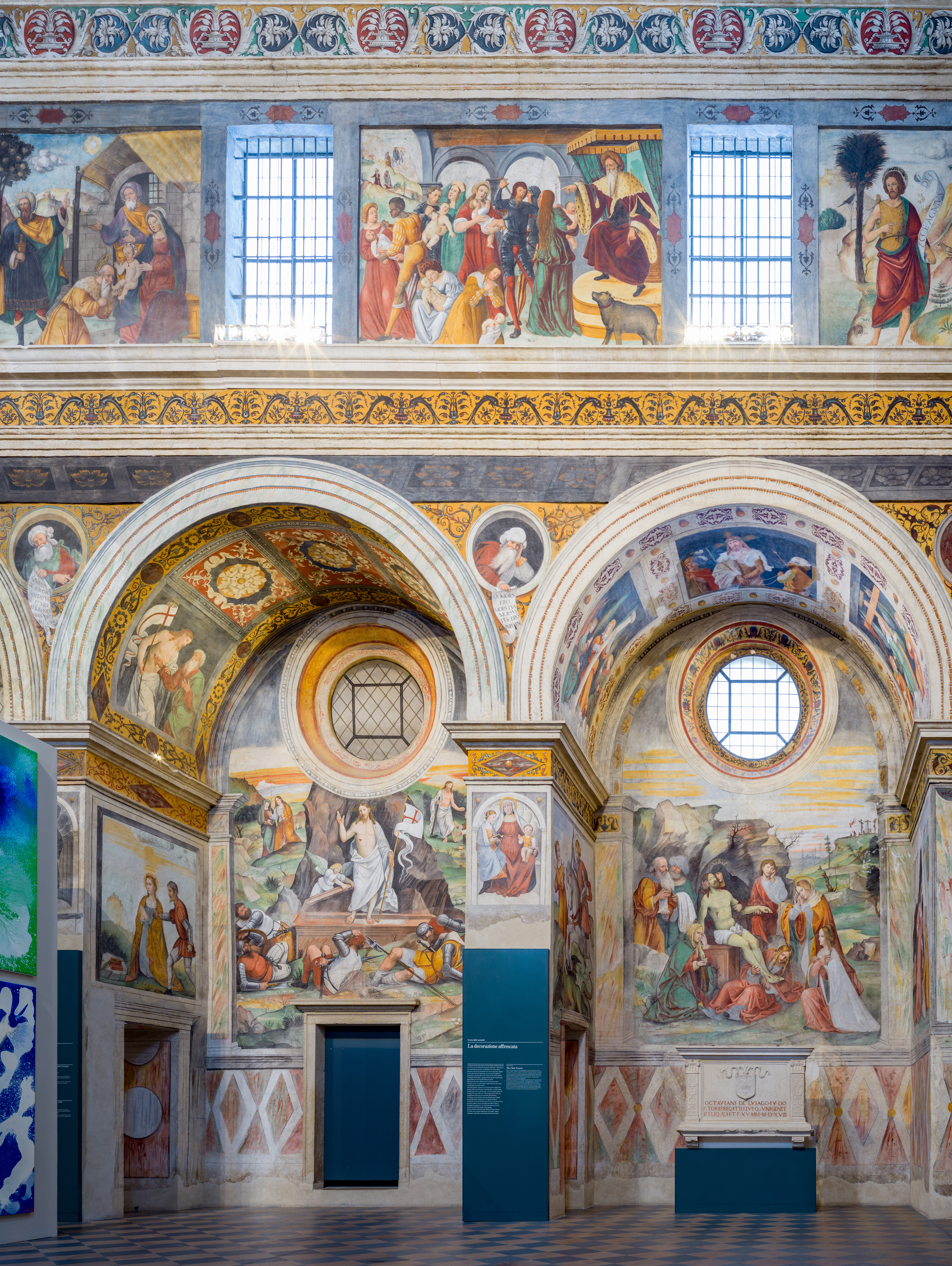
The nuns' choir of the Santa Giulia monastery in Brescia, with frescoes by Paolo da Caylina the Younger (lower level) and Floriano Ferramola (upper level), 1527ff.

==== Floriano Ferramola ====
Floriano Ferramola (ca. 1480-1528) was schooled in the late fifteenth-century Brescia nurtured by the art of Foppa and his elaborations, including those of Vincenzo Civerchio, generating a vast output especially in the second and third decades of the sixteenth century. More influenced by local movements than by Foppa's cultured art, his style is related to Umbrian-Emilian painting that penetrated into eastern Lombardy through Perugino and Lorenzo Costa. Ferramola's works always kept to modest but novelistic, storytelling tones.

It was Ferramola's art that attracted the vast majority of civil and religious patrons in early 16th-century Brescia: his famous Stories of Saints found widespread success in a variety of monasteries in the city and territory, for example in Santa Giulia, San Giuseppe, Santa Croce, and Santa Maria del Carmine (in collaboration with Civerchio), and then again in Lovere, Bedizzole, Nave, Bovezzo and Quinzano d'Oglio, creating a veritable school and influencing almost all provincial painters: most of the early 16th-century frescoes that have come down to us in churches throughout the Brescian territory can be traced to his style. Many interventions occurred in the palaces of the nobility of the time, especially in a city context: the cycle in the hall of honor of Palazzo Calini, now dispersed among the Victoria and Albert Museum, National Gallery and Pinacoteca Tosio Martinengo, represents one of the finest productions of secular painting in early sixteenth-century Lombardy.

The narrative serenity of which Ferramola became a master, as well as his chromatic tonalities, varied and delicate naturalistic, scenic and environmental notions had substantial repercussions on Moretto, who reached artistic maturity precisely during Ferramola's period of greatest productive activity (1520–30).

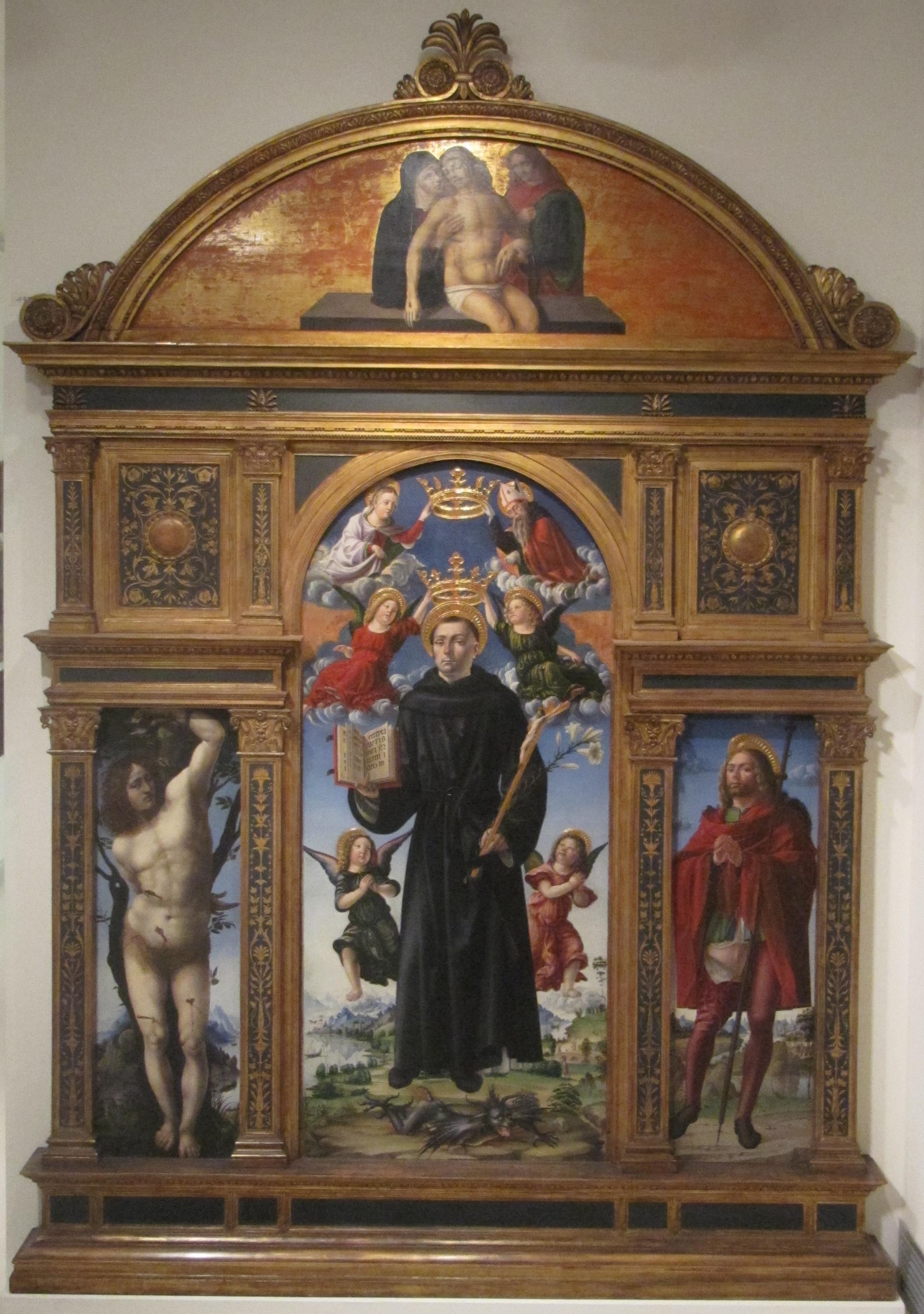
Vincenzo Civerchio and assistants, Polyptych of Saint Nicholas of Tolentino, 1495.

==== Vincenzo Civerchio ====
A native of Crema, Vincenzo Civerchio (1468/70-1544) worked mainly in Brescia from the last years of the 15th century. In this period he produced a substantial number of works, some lost (such as the frescoes in the choir of the Old Cathedral) and others that have come down to us, such as the Deposition in the church of Sant'Alessandro and part of a decorative cycle in the chapel of the Virgin for the aforementioned church of Santa Maria del Carmine, done in collaboration with Ferramola.

At the forefront of the painter's production, however, is the polyptych of St. Nicholas of Tolentino for the church of St. Barnabas, signed and dated 1495, a work of the highest value in which Civerchio reveals a vast composite culture derived from the teachings of Bergognone and Bernardino Butinone, connected with an effective painting technique and an accurate expressive realism of the characters.

==== Paolo da Caylina the Younger ====
Paolo da Caylina the Younger (c. 1485-1545) was also educated in the proto-Renaissance Brescia of Foppa and Civerchio, later growing up in the footsteps of Ferramola, with whom he often found himself collaborating, until he was called to the monastery of Santa Giulia to complete the frescoes in the nuns' choir.

Similar to the latter, Caylina also enjoyed great success among the patrons of the time, creating around him a school of like-minded painters. His production, however, quickly received strong influences from the great local masters, especially Moretto and Romanino, being practically contemporary with them. Already in works from the beginning of the century, for example in the Adoration of the Cross with Saints Constantine, Helena, and Sylvester for the church of Santa Croce, one can find the compositional patterns and expressive attitudes that these masters, especially Moretto, would repeat in their early productions and then evolve into more mature models.

Clear transitional features can also be found in the two panels with the Nativity and the Adoration of the Magi in the polyptych of the Madonna of Mercy in the church of Sant'Agata (c. 1520), where typically fifteenth-century forms are combined with a wide and deep spatiality, a softness of bodies and a chromatic richness with warm and luminous tones borrowed from the early production of Romanino and Moretto and from the new Venetian influences brought to local art by these authors.

=== The masters of the high Brescian Renaissance ===
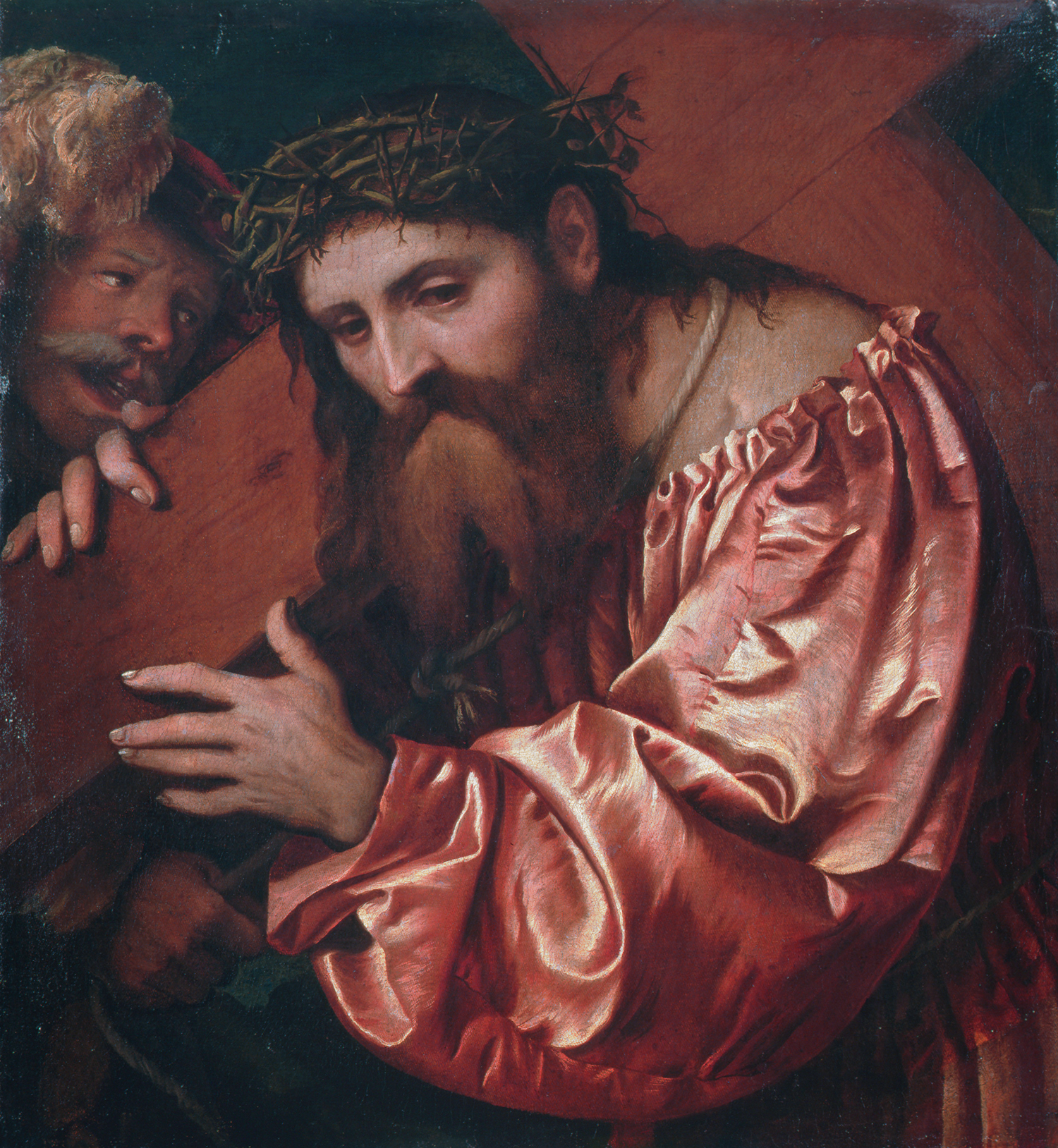
Romanino, Christ Carrying the Cross, 1540-1550 ca.

The early 16th-century Brescian school of painting has been defined by art historian Roberto Longhi as:

perhaps the richest in intelligence and almost secretive research boasted in northern Italy at that time. Its incontestable relations, and its equally obvious distinction from contemporary Venetian painting, as well as its fidelity to earlier traditions, its very rapid perceptions of the new, its refractions elsewhere in not too distant lands, the flowing sometimes in its veins of the fluid that Lotto was going to spread in Italy according to a topography as capricious as its forms, are some delightful questions that are not exactly unraveled so far.

— Roberto Longhi, Cose Bresciane, 1929, p. 317.

Longhi's opinion is shared by critics in general, so much so that they agree that the Brescian school was "the most intelligent and inquisitive" in all of northern Italy. The disastrous sack of Brescia in 1512, however, brought the city to its knees, putting an end to the myth of Brixia magnipotens (Note: On the myth of Brixia magnipotens cf. Zani 2010, pp. 24–25.) with notes to the text, cross-references and insights.) and to the lively cultural period imbued with humanistic ideals that it had experienced until then. The Serenissima intervened even more drastically, operating the so-called "leveling," that is, the destruction of any building within a kilometer and a half of the city walls, in order to eliminate any shelter or hiding place for the attackers. The real estate lost was countless, and several monasteries, having destroyed their original headquarters, were forced to take shelter in the city, building new churches within the wall.

To the general economic damage, superimposed on the already onerous reconstructions to be carried out after the sack, the Venetian Republic responded by offering reductions and sometimes exemptions from taxes, so that churches, convents and monasteries looted or completely destroyed by the "leveling" could be restored and rebuilt. This gave rise to a vibrant artistic patronage during that period, which fostered the emergence of local personalities. From around 1520 (the "leveling" was operated between 1516 and 1517) there was thus the emergence of a group of painters of almost the same age who, by blending their Lombard and Venetian cultural roots, achieved results of great originality in the peninsula's artistic panorama: Romanino, Moretto and Savoldo, defined by the art historian Roberto Longhi as "the predecessors of Caravaggio."

In providential coincidence, in 1522 Titian's Averoldi Polyptych for the presbytery of the collegiate church of Santi Nazaro e Celso arrived in Brescia, which would enjoy a very wide, immediate popularity among local artistic exponents and would constitute a basic point of reference in the execution of a whole series of new works of art.

==== Romanino ====
Gerolamo Romani, known as Romanino, made his debut around 1510 with a Lamentation in the Gallerie dell'Accademia in Venice, where to a basis of Lombard realism he added references from other schools, such as that of Ferrara. In Padua he then saw Titian's frescoes in the Scuola del Santo, from which he took a heightened sense for full-bodied color and dynamic composition. An early homage to the Venetian master was found in the Santa Giustina Altarpiece (Civic Museums of Padua, 1513), in which memories of his Lombard formation also surface, such as the Bramante-esque architecture of the vaulting that towers over and frames the figures.

Back in his homeland, in about 1517 Romanino reproduced a similar scheme in the San Francesco Altarpiece for the local church of San Francesco, in which can already be seen the physical types that distinguished his later production. Without straying too far from Brescia in the following years he visited various sites, such as that of Cremona Cathedral (Passion of Christ, c. 1520), where he came into contact with Pordenone's magniloquent modes, and the small towns of the Brescian valleys (Breno, Bienno, Pisogne), where he left panels and frescoes with interesting accents to everyday reality, strongly represented in gestures, customs and expressions.

In 1521 his cooperation with Moretto on the Chapel of the Sacrament in the church of San Giovanni Evangelista established the presence of a real school in the town. The greater success of the latter prompted Romanino to concentrate mainly on the province, which was more receptive to his naturalistic style, indulging in a few refined digressions such as the frescoes in the Buonconsiglio Castle in Trento after 1530, alongside Dosso Dossi.

==== Moretto ====
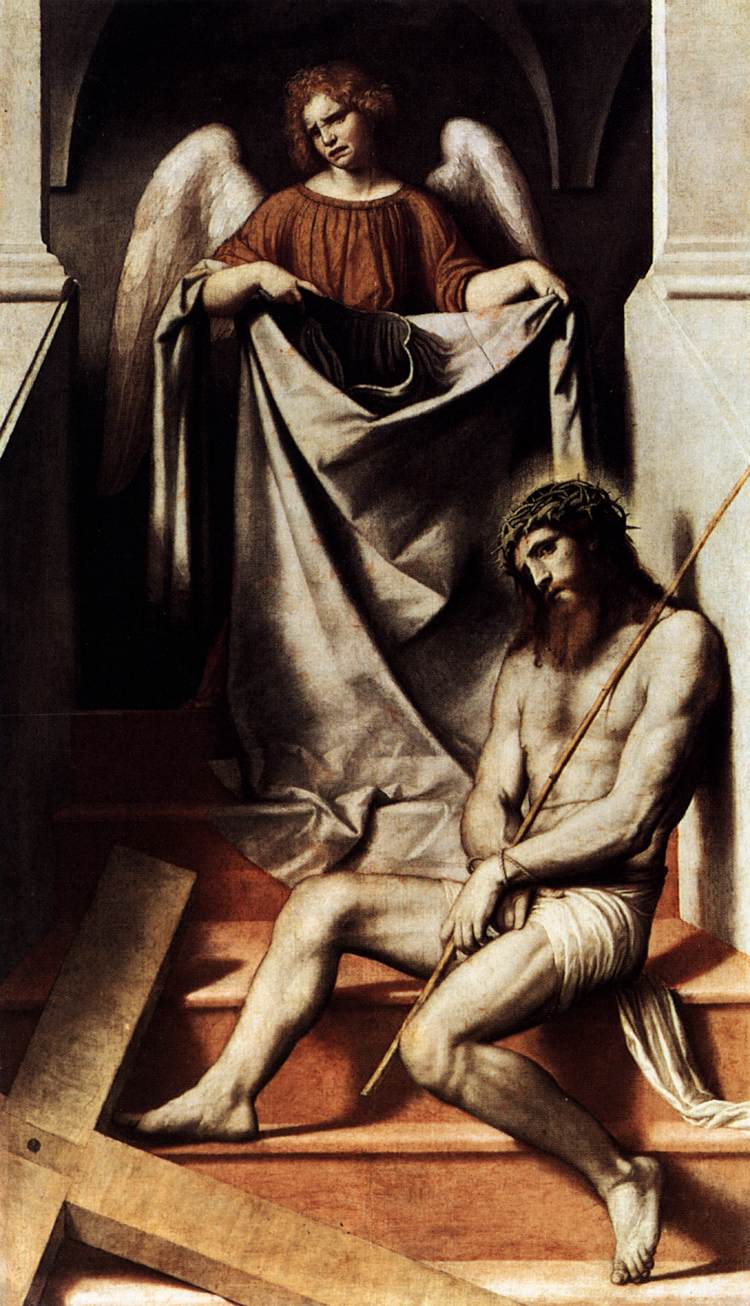
Moretto, Christ and the Angel (c. 1550)

Alessandro Bonvicino, known as Moretto, worked mainly in Brescia, so his style is more rooted in the local tradition and has been likened by scholars, such as Roberto Longhi, to the style of Vincenzo Foppa. He often worked for local churches and private patrons, becoming the most sought-after painter in the city. Among his early works is the Elijah and the Angel for the Chapel of the Sacrament in San Giovanni (1521-1523), with a Flemish-style background.

In later years he came under the influence of Titian, due to the arrival of the aforementioned Averoldi Polyptych in 1522, and of Raphael (seen in Marcantonio Raimondi's prints), arriving at softer, more composed manners: it is no coincidence that works such as the St. Justina of Padua with a Donor (c. 1530) were once attributed to Sanzio.

A lively portraitist, praised by Vasari, in his works one can detect traces of Lorenzo Lotto and Hans Holbein the Younger. Beginning in the 1540s he became one of the most highly regarded interpreters of Counter-Reformation instances, with altarpieces often devoted to the theme of the Eucharistic sacrifice, such as Christ and the Angel (1550-1554), a late masterpiece set to a palette of muted tones, pathetic sentiments, and a looseness of perspective, with the figure of Christ skillfully articulated along the steps.

==== Savoldo ====
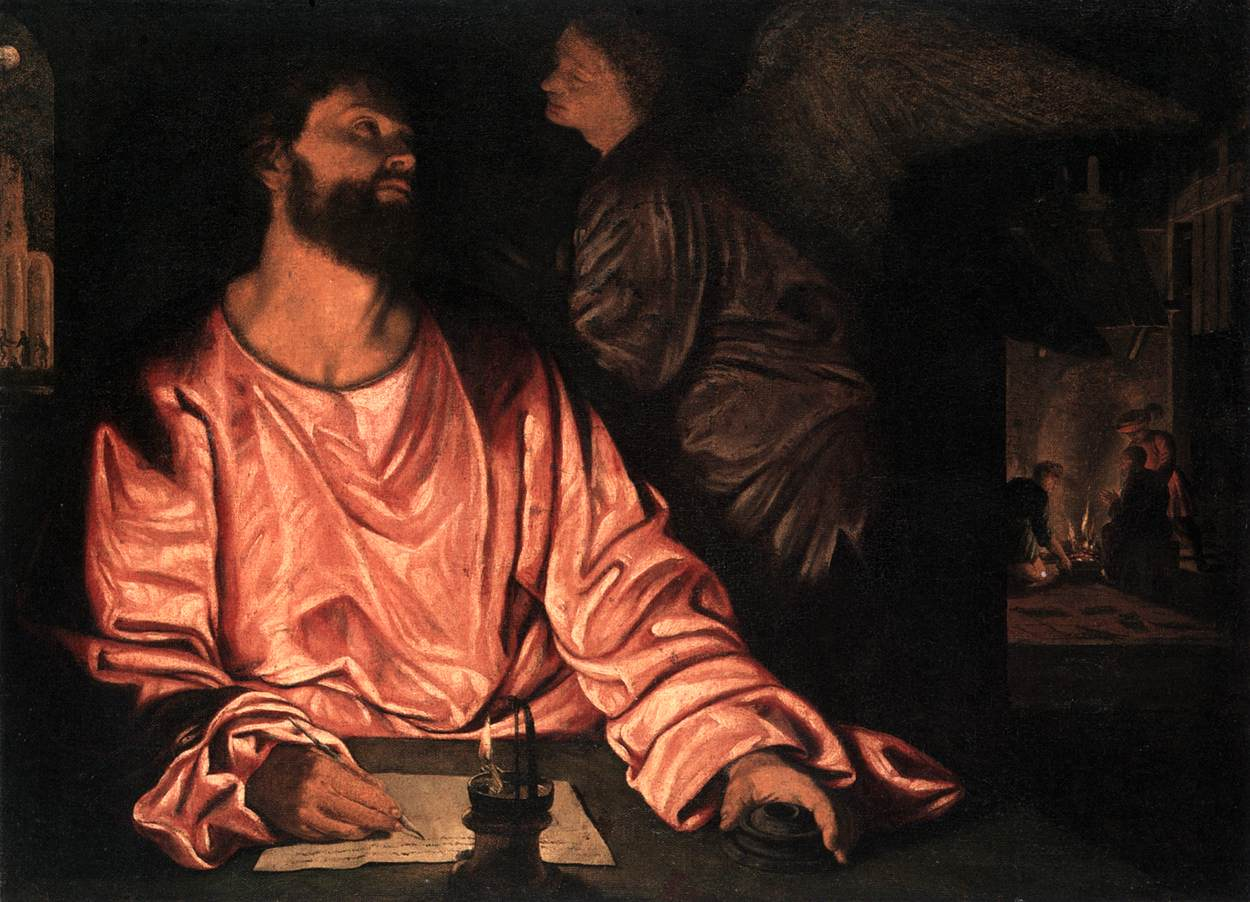
Savoldo, St. Matthew and the Angel, c. 1530-1535

Giovanni Girolamo Savoldo was the third Brescian master, and his output can be placed entirely within two decades, from about 1520 to 1540. No early works are known of him, which makes the reconstruction of his formation difficult. In 1506 he is known to have been in Parma and in 1508 in Florence, when the city was in turmoil because of the presence of the extraordinary new works of Leonardo, Michelangelo, and Raphael. By 1520 he was settled in Venice, where he came into contact with the material effects of Titian's full-bodied color and Giorgione's contemplative atmospheres, while remaining faithful to his Lombard naturalistic background.

Particularly famous are his works with throbbing light, such as the Magdalene series (c. 1540), or St. Matthew and the Angel in the Metropolitan Museum (1534). The latter shows a nocturnal setting with a light source inside the painting (the candle in the foreground) and striking chiaroscuro effects that anticipate Caravaggism.

Prominent among his many portraits is the Portrait of a Clad Warrior in the Louvre (c. 1529), where the subject is portrayed in foreshortening and reflected by two mirrors, a true pictorial tour de force related to disquisitions on the comparison of the arts. While in the large-format altarpieces the artist showed adherence to traditional schemes, open to Titian's influences, in the medium-sized works intended for private individuals he experiments with more original solutions drawing on a vast repertoire, even reaching as far as Hieronymus Bosch.

=== Renaissance sculpture in Brescia ===
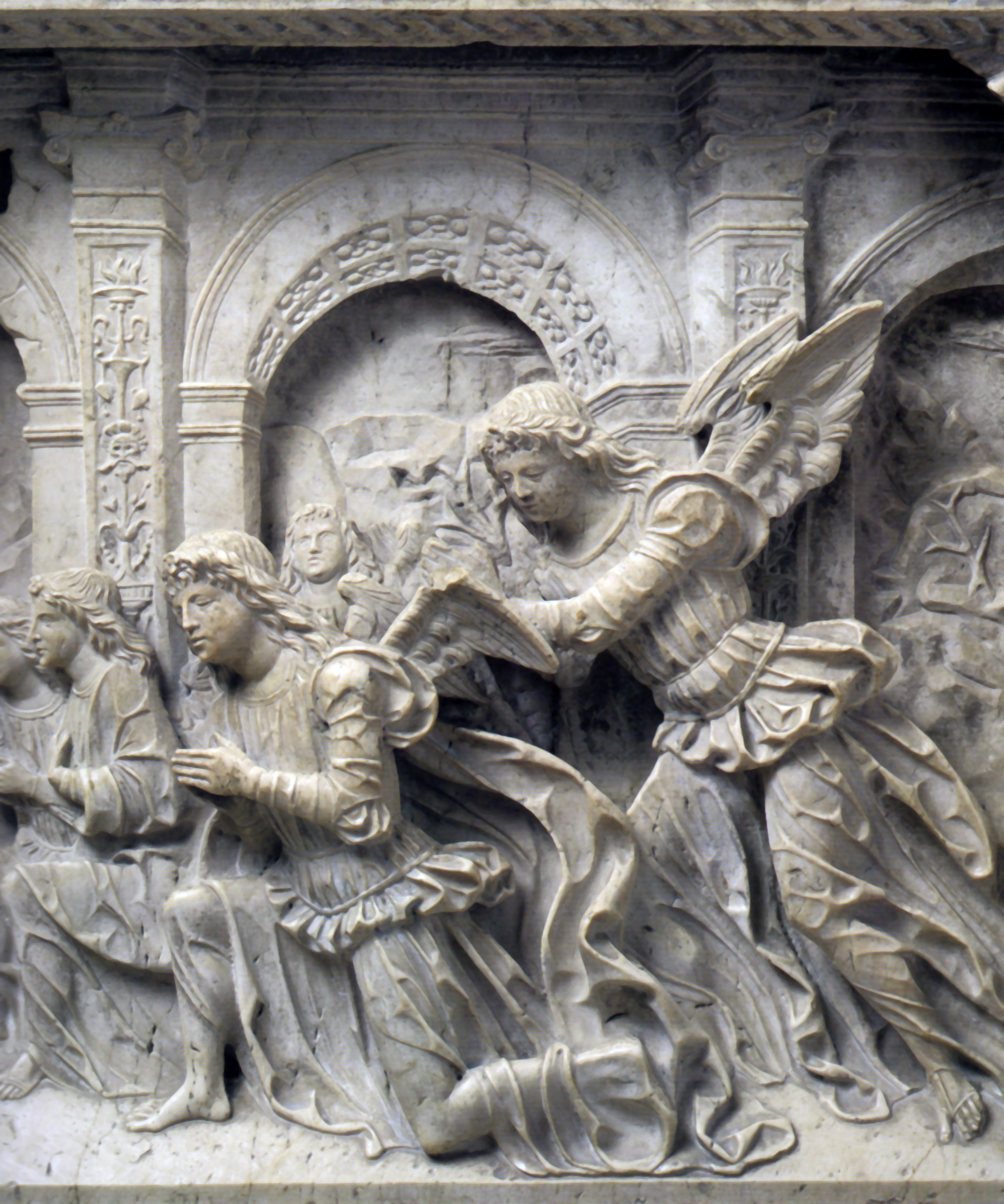
Gasparo Cairano, Caprioli Adoration (detail, 1495-1500).

The important variation of Renaissance sculpture developed in Brescia from about the 1460s onward, within the framework of the Venetian Renaissance culture, peaked between the end of the century and the beginning of the next one, a period in which a series of public and private worksites were able to produce absolutely original works, ranging from the refined and experimental sculptural framework of the church of Santa Maria dei Miracoli to the regular classicism of the Palazzo della Loggia.

The protagonist of this fortunate as well as brief period, cut short in 1512 with the invasion of the French and the subsequent sack of Brescia, was Gasparo Cairano, acknowledged author of works of the highest artistic level such as the ark of Sant'Apollonio, the Caprioli Adoration, the Martinengo Mausoleum, and, first and foremost, the cycle of the Caesars for the elevations of the Palazzo della Loggia, praised in print as early as 1504 by Pomponius Gauricus' De sculptura. Contemporaries of Cairano were other authors, often present in Brescia only for short periods of their careers, such as Tamagnino and the Sanmicheli workshop, along with other minor artists placeable in the master's circle, such as Antonio Mangiacavalli and Ambrogio Mazzola, while many of the sculptors of Venetian influence active in the city during the entire second half of the 15th century remain largely anonymous.

== Moroni, between Bergamo and Brescia ==
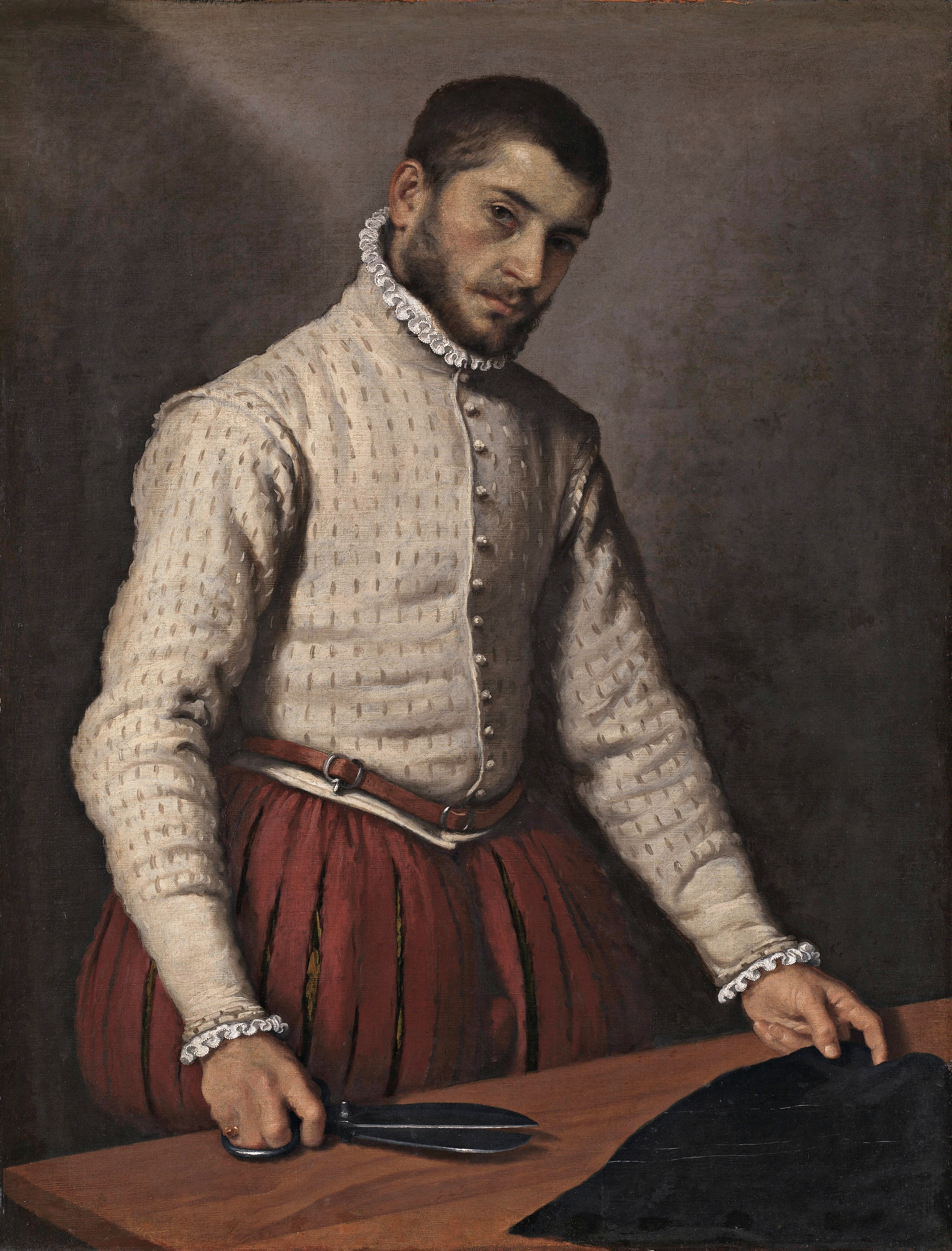
Moroni, Portrait of a Tailor (c. 1570-1575)

In the second half of the century the figure of Giovan Battista Moroni stood out in the Bergamo-Brescia area. A native of Bergamo, he studied in Brescia with Moretto, then returned to his hometown. He was the author of altarpieces faithful to the principles of the Counter-Reformation, but excelled above all as a portrait painter capable of creating works of intense psychological connotation, handled with sublime technique.

== See also ==
- Renaissance art
- Venetian Renaissance

== Bibliography ==
Ancient sources

- Pomponio Gaurico (1504). De sculptura. Firenze.
- Giovan Battista Carboni (1760). Luigi Chizzola (ed.). Le pitture e le sculture di Brescia che sono esposte al pubblico con un'appendice di alcune private gallerie. Brescia: dalle stampe di Giambatista Bossini.

Modern sources

- P. V. Begni Redona (1992). Pitture e sculture in San Nazaro e Celso. Brescia: Editrice La Scuola.
- Pierluigi De Vecchi; Elda Cerchiari Necchi (1999). I tempi dell'arte. Vol. 2. Milano: Bompiani.
- Gaetano Panazza; Camillo Boselli (1946). Pitture in Brescia dal Duecento all'Ottocento: catalogo della mostra. Brescia: Tip. Morcelliana.
- Bruno Passamani (1988). Guida della pinacoteca Tosio-Martinengo di Brescia. Grafo.
- Rossanna Prestini (1990). Il monastero di Santa Croce in Brescia. Brescia: Opera Pavoniana.
- Livia Vannini (1989). Visita alla chiesa in Sant'Agata - La chiesa e la comunità. Brescia: Editrice Vannini.
- Roberto Longhi (1917). Cose bresciane del Cinquecento. Roma: Tip. Unione Ed.
- Roberto Longhi (1968) [1929]. Me pinxit e quesiti caravaggeschi: 1928-1934. Firenze: Sansoni.
- Andrea Bayer (2003). North of the Apennines: Sixteenth-Century italian painting in Lombardy and Emilia-Romagna. New York: Metropolitan Museum of Art.
- Zani, Vito (2010). Gasparo Cairano e la scultura monumentale del Rinascimento a Brescia (1489-1517 ca.). Roccafranca: La Compagnia della Stampa. OCLC 800227892.
- Mina Gregori (2004). "Caravaggio and Lombardy: A Critical account of the Artist's Formation". Painters of reality: the legacy of Leonardo and Caravaggio in Lombardy. New York: The Metropolitan Museum of Art. pp. 23–42.
- Andrea Bayer (2004). "Brescia and Bergamo: Humble Reality in Sixteenth Century Devotional Art and Portraiture". Painters of reality: the legacy of Leonardo and Caravaggio in Lombardy. New York: The Metropolitan Museum of Art. pp. 105–112.
- Zani, Vito (2011). "Maestri e cantieri nel Quattrocento e nella prima metà del Cinquecento". In Valerio Terraroli (ed.). Scultura in Lombardia. Arti plastiche a Brescia e nel Bresciano dal XV al XX secolo. Milano: Skira. OCLC 936152663.
- Stefano Zuffi (2005). Il Cinquecento. Milano: Electra.
- Stefano Zuffi (2007). Grande atlante del Rinascimento. Milano: Electra.
- Mauro Zanchi (2011). Lotto. I simboli. Firenze: Giunti.
- Francesco Frangi (2018). Tiziano e la pittura del Cinquecento tra Venezia e Brescia. Cinisello Balsamo: Silvana.
