= Brescian Renaissance sculpture =

Sculpture during the Renaissance period in Brescia, Italy

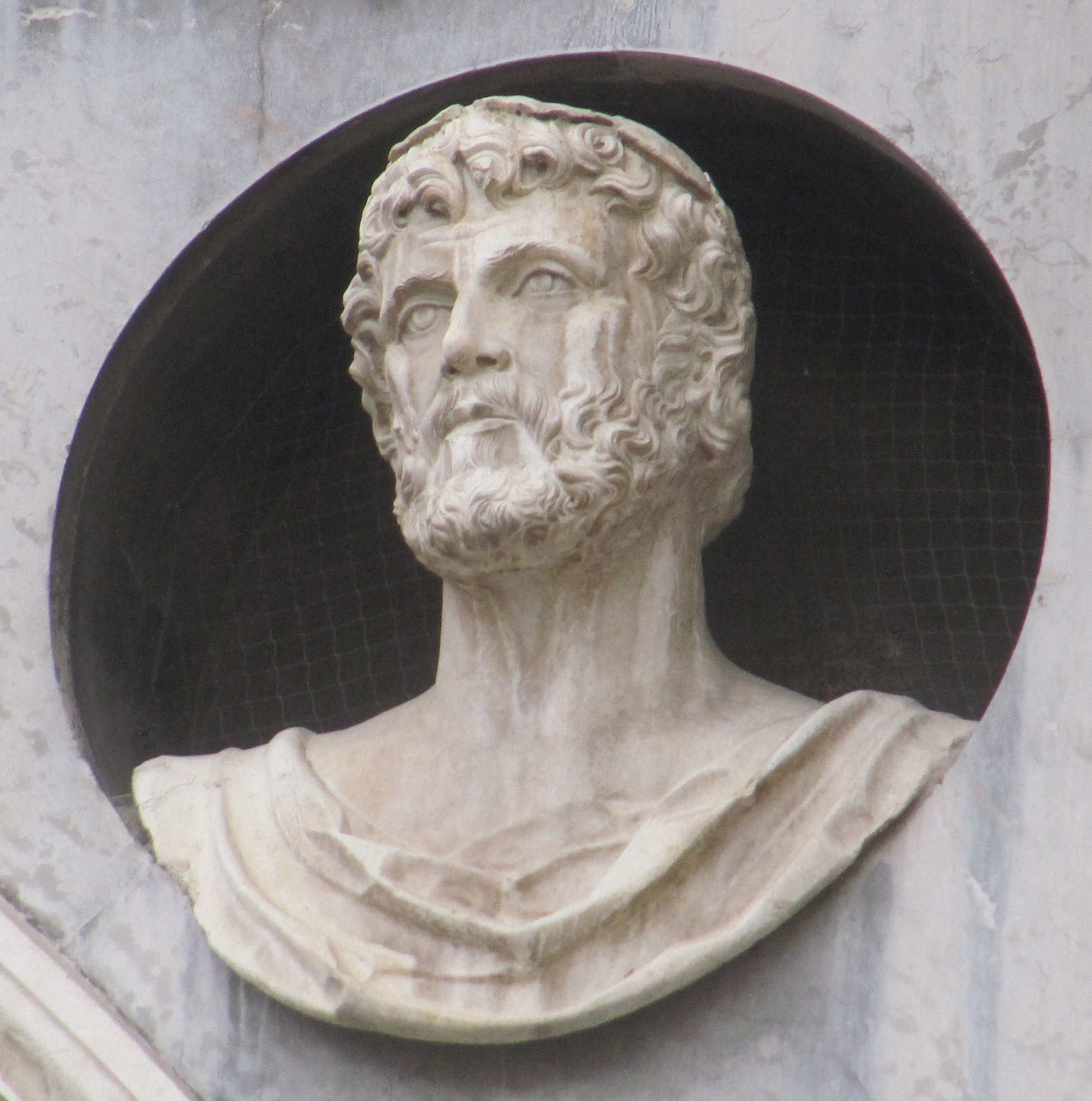
Gasparo Cairano, bust of Caesar, c. 1498.

Brescian Renaissance sculpture was an important offshoot of Renaissance sculpture developed in Brescia from around the 1460s within the framework of Venetian culture, peaking between the end of the century and the beginning of the next. In this period, a series of public and private worksites were able to produce absolutely original works, ranging from the refined and experimental sculptural style of the church of Santa Maria dei Miracoli to the regular classicism of the Palazzo della Loggia.

The protagonist of this brief period, cut short in 1512 with the invasion of the French and the subsequent sack of Brescia, was Gasparo Cairano, acknowledged author of works of the highest artistic level such as the ark of St. Apollonius, the Caprioli Adoration, the Martinengo Mausoleum, and, first and foremost, the cycle of the Caesars for the elevations of the Palazzo della Loggia, praised in print as early as 1504 by Pomponius Gauricus' De sculptura. Contemporaries of Cairano were other more or less Brescian authors, often present in Brescia only for short periods of their careers, such as Tamagnino and the Sanmicheli workshop, together with other minor artists who could be placed in the master's circle, such as Antonio Mangiacavalli and Ambrogio Mazzola, while the many sculptors of Venetian influence who worked in the city throughout the second half of the 15th century remain largely anonymous.

== Transitional art in 15th-century Brescia ==
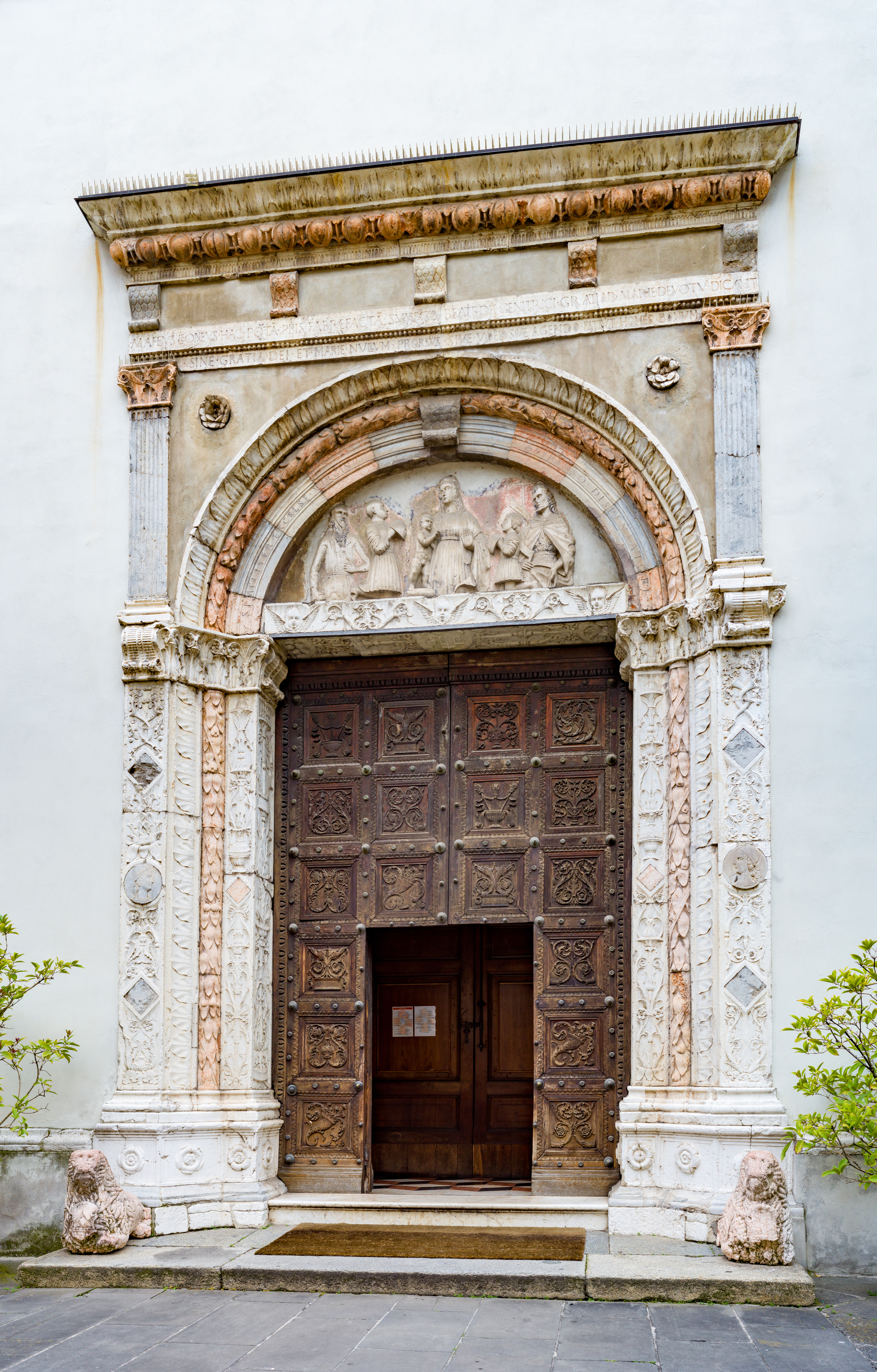
The portal of the basilica of Santa Maria delle Grazie in Brescia.

The scanty documents that have come down to us, as well as the few surviving testimonies, do not allow us to adequately reconstruct the picture of sculptural art in Brescia in the decades prior to the opening of the Santa Maria dei Miracoli building site. However, the absence of a significant scenario of local craftsmen capable of producing marble works of a certain quality seems clear, although in the field of terracotta working, in those years, the school of the Master of the Singing Angels, author of works of remarkable quality, flourished in Brescia and its surroundings. After the almost nothingness, from the documentary point of view, of the 1950s and 1960s, (Note: Only very few works are known, almost all of them of public commission and practically all lost. Also known are some sculptors of Brescian origin who were present in Rome and Bergamo in those years, but who left works of little interest and, again, almost all lost. Cf. Zani (2010, p. 89, n. 2.)) sporadic works are encountered in which there is a gradual updating to the decorative and antiquarian features borrowed from the Colleoni Chapel, such as the altar of the Averoldi chapel in the church of Santa Maria del Carmine and the portal of the same church, the portal of the basilica of Santa Maria delle Grazie and the portal of the church of the Most Holy Body of Christ.

To the 1970s belongs a category of works conceived in an austere and stiffened manner, seeking, in this sense, a more monumental expression of modeling, for example, the illustrated lunette of the aforementioned portal of Santa Maria delle Grazie, the triptych of St. Honorius, and the ark of St. Paterius, both in the Santa Giulia Museum. Clearly detached from this type of representation are the first two works that are considered truly innovative for the artistic sculptural scene of the time, namely the tombstone of Bartolomeo Lamberti at Santa Giulia and the funerary monument of Domenico de Dominici in the Old Cathedral. These two artifacts seem to have little to do with the expression of local art of the period and are therefore attributable to external masters from the hinterland of Veneto or to Brescian masters already active in centers such as Verona or Vicenza. Thus the already documented, constant movement of numerous Lombard artists to the Po Valley area and even beyond is further confirmed.

In this context also fits the figure of Filippo Grassi, Milanese by origin and employed by the city of Brescia from 1481 as a stone-cutter while, from 1495-1496, also as architect and chief engineer of the Loggia building site. Of interest is the fact that Grassi, even in light of his resume, is never documented on works of a figurative or decorative nature, either at the sanctuary of the Miracles or at the Loggia: this appears as an indication of the orientation that, progressively, public commissions were taking on the levels of artistic culture of the workers active in their construction sites, levels that Grassi evidently could not offer and that the municipality was seeking elsewhere. These talents would eventually be found in Gasparo Cairano and his ability to interpret in stone the Renaissance boasts of the high offices, public and private, of Brescia in the Renaissance outbreak, an aptitude preferred to the refined and elegant experimentalism of the Sanmicheli.

== The Brescian workshop of the Sanmicheli ==
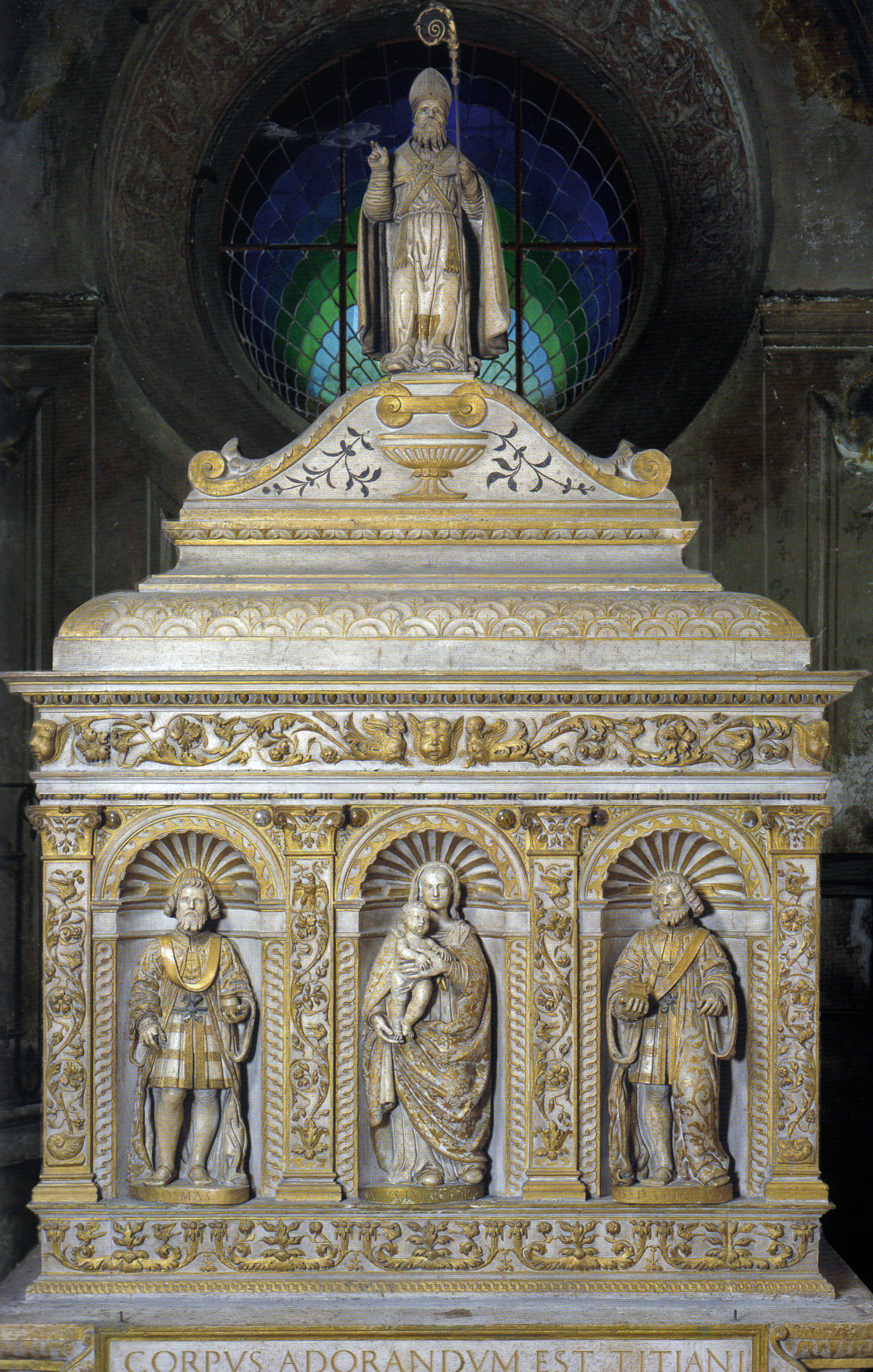
Sanmicheli workshop, ark of Saint Titian.

The earliest documentary information on the workshop of the brothers Bartolomeo and Giovanni Sanmicheli, originally from Porlezza on Lake Como, dates back to the early 1580s in Verona, and by the end of the century a number of important commissions obtained in various cities in northern Italy are documented. (Note: Of particular note are the chapel of the Blessed Sacrament in the cathedral of Mantua, among other things the only certain 15th-century Sanmichelian work that has survived in its entirety to the present day, and a lost chapel in the church of Santo Spirito in Bergamo. For the Mantuan chapel see Ferrari & Zanata (1991, pp. 84, 94, 98 n. 45.), for the rest Zani (2010, p. 93, n. 29.)) The business of the two sculptors probably also landed in Brescia, since Bartolomeo is reported to have been resident there from at least 1501 to 1503, (Note: In support of this thesis there is both a direct source, specifically a Brescian notarial deed of 1503 that qualifies Bartolomeo as a citizen of Brescia, and an indirect one, namely the Veronese registry of 1501 and 1502 that lists Paolo Sanmicheli as the son of Bartolomeo “de Brixia.” Cf. Zani (2010, p. 93, n. 30.)) and such a prolonged presence can only be justified by admitting the existence of significant local activity. There is reason to believe, however, that the Sanmicheli chapter in Brescia must have roots far deeper than the two-year period documented, starting with the “Jacobo” or “Iacomo” almost always qualified as an “intayador” (Note: “Engraver,” in Brescian dialect.) and always ranking first in the 1493 payment slips for sculpture work at the Santa Maria dei Miracoli site, whose family workshop would therefore be its main creator, followed by hosts of “tayapreda”, (Note: “Stone carver,” in Brescian dialect.) and again to the “Jacobus da Verona” who on December 19, 1495 began work on the first of four giant capitals on the facade of the Palazzo della Loggia.

This person could be identified with Jacopo Sanmicheli, (Note: The identification is based on a number of stylistic and documentary findings that also involve what Giorgio Vasari reported in Lives about his humanistic studies. See Zani (2010, p. 94) and notes to the text.) just as the identity of Matteo Sanmicheli could be concealed behind the “Matteo da Proleza” recorded in 1493 among the “tayapreda” of the sanctuary of the Miracles. (Note: Again, a stylistic analysis of the sophisticated intellectual component that Matteo demonstrated in his Piedmontese works becomes relevant, as pointed out in Ferretti (1990, p. 258). See also Zani (2010, p. 94.)) The Sanmicheli's Brescian career thus continued in the second, great building site of Renaissance Brescia, that of the Loggia, where, however, the local style, initially focused on ornate and very fine surface decoration, migrated toward horizons of power and structural classicism, less particular, in fact foreign to the family's specialization.

== The rise of Gasparo Cairano ==
Gasparo Cairano's debut in Brescia was the work for which he was paid on December 24, 1489: the cycle of the twelve statues of Apostles for the first dome of the church of Santa Maria dei Miracoli in Brescia, executed at approximately the same time that Tamagnino was executing his twelve counterpoint Angels, to be arranged in the lower register. However, Cairano's complete autography can be limited to no more than two or three pieces, although in general they can be traced back to the expressionistic style, very popular at the time, introduced by Antonio Mantegazza. In general, the entire stone production of the Santa Maria dei Miracoli site executed in the decade following the cycle of the Apostles, limited to what is present inside the building, can be traced back to Cairano and his collaborators. It cannot be ruled out that this preparatory work in itself led to the continuation of the work, in a real confrontation between Cairano and Tamagnino.

As soon as he had earned the right to continue work inside the sanctuary of the Miracles, Cairano's art and career began a rapid ascent: as early as November 16, 1491, he was paid for the two keystones for the new presbytery of the old cathedral, which was being built under Bernardino da Martinengo's design and the only figural sculptures present in the new construction. Two years later, in 1493, Cairano would begin his own work on the Loggia building site.

It was precisely with the Loggia that the now-formed Gasparo Cairano burst onto the Brescian art scene, whose influence of the Caesars sanctioned the beginning of the decline of the Sanmichelian experimentation at the Sanctuary of Miracles, which had effectively ridden the local trend of Renaissance ornamentation, in which, however, municipality and nobility no longer mirrored each other. Probably in the last years of the century the Sanmicheli intervened in the stone decoration of the Caprioli Chapel in the church of San Giorgio, the same one for which Cairano, almost simultaneously, prepared his Adoration, among his masterpieces, manifesting for the first time outside the Loggia a parallelism between the two workshops, but it is not known to what extent.

== Brescian sculpture after the Loggia building site ==
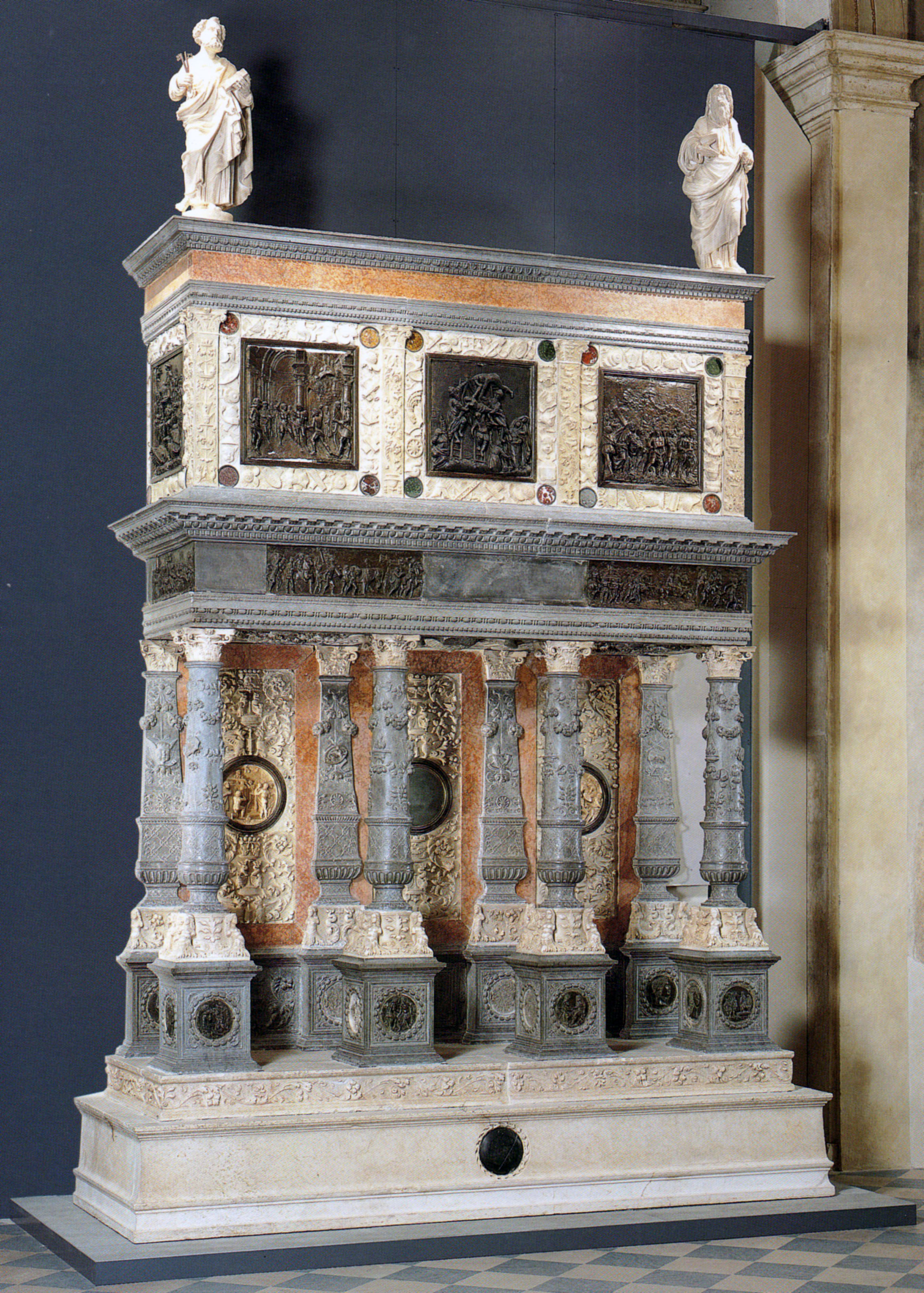
Martinengo Mausoleum.

Bartolomeo Sanmicheli, at the beginning of the new century, probably tried to make a comeback in the local artistic scene with the ark of Saint Titian of 1505, characterized by a strong decorative connotation, and perhaps aspired to the commission of the ark of Saint Apollonius, which had already hovered since 1503 from the discovery of the relics of the holy bishop. Also dated to 1503 is the commission to Bernardino delle Croci of the most important funerary monument in Brescia at the time and among the greatest masterpieces of local Renaissance sculpture: the Martinengo Mausoleum, whose troubled execution lasted for about fifteen years. An early involvement of the Sanmicheli in the initial phase of the commission can be conjectured, especially on the basis of the prevailing decorative character of the monument, foreign to the decidedly more rigorous and classicist models of Cairano. However, the protagonist must have played a role in the execution of the important artifact, since the two statues at the top, depicting St. Peter and St. Paul, are undoubtedly attributable to his hand and are derivative of the same saints present in the portal of the cathedral of Salò, while most of the friezes and elaborate mirroring are based on examples found on the fronts of the Loggia and in the portal of the staircase building, executed in 1508. On the other hand, Cairano's workshop was the only one left in the city, after the dispersion of the Sanmicheli already in the first decade of the century, capable of successfully working on such a complex, of high technical as well as cultural value.

Still around 1505, the reconstruction of the church of San Pietro in Oliveto was begun, probably seized by the Sanmicheli but with Gasparo Cairano's chisel in the tondi with the Apostles: it is worth noting that these reliefs are the only figurative works on the site besides the fine carvings on pilasters and cornices of the chapels, the product of a Sanmichelian specialization by then late and no longer responding to the preferences of the time, changed in the aftermath of the classicist candor experienced with the Loggia. Gasparo's ultimate response was not long in coming in the 1508 ark of St. Apollonius, where his decisive artistic superiority was sanctioned once and for all, certainly fostered by a now decided preference on the part of Brescian patrons.

Precisely around these years, and perhaps because of the presentation on the Brescian scene of this great, definitive work by Cairano, the Sanmicheli family left Brescia, where they would never return, bound for Casale Monferrato, where Bartolomeo died two years later. Matteo, who left alongside his father, continued and ended his career in Piedmont, in the Turin area, leaving there many of his best-known works.

== The sack of Brescia and the conclusion of the artistic period ==
By the end of the first decade of the century, the European political climate was heating up: the events of the War of the League of Cambrai were just around the corner, and the first French incursions into Brescia were a symptom of a trend that was now in its twilight years. Within a few years there was the Sack of Brescia in 1512 by the French led by Gaston of Foix, which not only threw the city into ruin but also dissolved the myth of the Brixia magnipotens, (Note: On the myth of Brixia magnipotens see Zani (2010, pp. 24-25.) with relevant notes to the text, bibliography and documentation cited.) putting an end to a lively season of accomplishments and humanistic dreams, a phenomenon that would also affect the rest of the peninsula in the following decades.

The city's great Renaissance construction sites came to a halt, including that of the Palazzo della Loggia, which still had at the base of the scaffolding many of Cairano's reliefs already prepared for assembly on the fronts of the second level, including the two angular Trophies, and which would remain there for a fifty-year period, awaiting the resumption of work under the direction of Ludovico Beretta. The city's priorities changed radically, from artistic and cultural splendor to the recovery of basic vital functions.

Gasparo Cairano undoubtedly suffered from this period of sudden and profound decline due to the sharp contraction in commissions. Leaving behind a decade of intense activity, with even a convulsive overlapping of commitments, he entered a phase of his artistic career that was decidedly obscure from the point of view of documents and the works he completed: the last document reporting him was the contract for the portal of the cathedral of Chiari in 1513, while the next document, dated 1517, says he was already dead.

== See also ==
- Renaissance art in Bergamo and Brescia

== Bibliography ==
- Corna Pellegrini, Alessandra (2011). Floriano Ferramola in Santa Maria del Carmine (in Italian). Brescia: Tipografia Camuna.
- Ferrari, M.; Zanata, I. (1991). Storia e arte religiosa a Mantova. Visite di Pontefici e la reliquia del Preziosissimo Sangue [History and religious art in Mantua. Visits of Pontiffs and the Relic of the Precious Blood.] (in Italian). Mantova: Casa del Mantegna.
- Ferretti, Massimo (1990). Domenico della Rovere e il Duomo nuovo di Torino. Rinascimento a Roma e in Piemonte [Domenico della Rovere and the New Cathedral of Turin. Renaissance in Rome and Piedmont] (in Italian). Torino: Editris.
- Fisogni, Fiorenzo (2011). Scultura in Lombardia. Arti plastiche a Brescia e nel Bresciano dal XV al XX secolo [Sculpture in Lombardy. Plastic arts in Brescia and the Brescia area from the 15th to the 20th century.] (in Italian). Milano: Skira. ISBN 978-88-572-0523-6. OCLC 936152663.
- Galli, Aldo (1998). "Il Maestro degli angeli cantori e le più antiche sculture lombarde in terracotta" [The Master of the Singing Angels and Lombardy's oldest terracotta sculptures]. Nuovi Studi. Rivista di arte antica e moderna (in Italian) (6).
- Guerrini, Paolo (1930). Memorie storiche della diocesi di Brescia [Historical Memoirs of the Diocese of Brescia] (PDF) (in Italian). Vol. I. Brescia: Moretto.
- Ragni, Elena; Gianfranceschi, Ida; Mondini, Maurizio, eds. (1998). L'età veneta, l'immagine della città, la scultura monumentale. Santa Giulia, museo della città a Brescia [Venetian age, the image of the city, monumental sculpture. Santa Giulia, museum of the city in Brescia] (in Italian). Milano: Electa.
- Ragni, Elena Lucchesi; Gianfranceschi, Ida; Mondini, Maurizio, eds. (2003). Il coro delle monache - Cori e corali, catalogo della mostra [The nuns' choir - Choirs and chorales, exhibition catalog] (in Italian). Milano: Skira. ISBN 88-8491-533-3. OCLC 52746424.
- Peroni, Adriano (1963). Storia di Brescia [History of Brescia] (in Italian). Brescia: Treccani.
- Schofield, Richard V. (2002). Bramante milanese e l'architettura del Rinascimento lombardo [Milanese Bramante and the architecture of the Lombard Renaissance] (in Italian). Venezia: Marsilio.
- Zani, Vito (2010). Gasparo Cairano e la scultura monumentale del Rinascimento a Brescia (1489-1517 ca.) [Gasparo Cairano and monumental Renaissance sculpture in Brescia (c. 1489-1517).] (in Italian). Roccafranca: La Compagnia della Stampa. ISBN 978-88-8486-400-0. OCLC 800227892.
- Zani, Vito (2011). Scultura in Lombardia. Arti plastiche a Brescia e nel Bresciano dal XV al XX secolo [Sculpture in Lombardy. Plastic arts in Brescia and the Brescia area from the 15th to the 20th century.] (in Italian). Milano: Skira. ISBN 978-88-572-0523-6. OCLC 936152663.
