= Cicognara =

Cicognara is an Italian surname. Notable people with the surname include:

- Antonio Cicognara (1480–after 1500), Italian painter
- Leopoldo Cicognara (1767–1834), Italian artist, art collector, art historian, and bibliophile
