= Francesco Maria Ricchino =

Francesco Maria Ricchino may refer to two architects:

- Francesco Ricchino (died 1560s), Renaissance architect, painter and poet from Rovato
- Francesco Maria Richini (1584–1658), Baroque architect from Milan
