= St Margaret of Antioch with Two Saints =

1530 painting by Moretto da Brescia

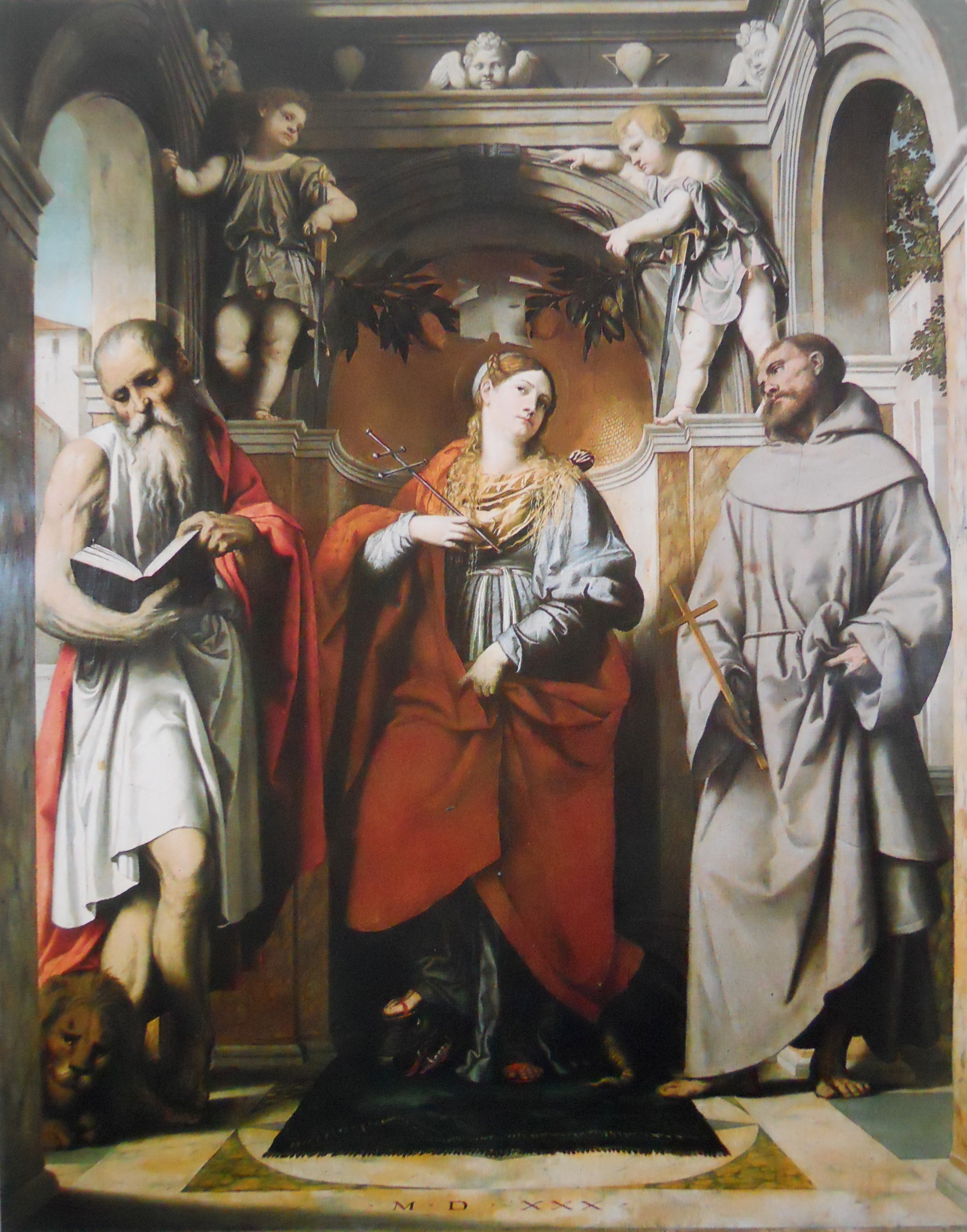

St Margaret of Antioch with Two Saints is a 1530 oil on panel painting by Moretto da Brescia on display on the side-altar of St Jerome in the church of San Francesco in Brescia. To the left of Margaret of Antioch is shown Saint Jerome, whilst to the right is Francis of Assisi.

It originally stood on the side altar dedicated to St Margaret in the same church, where it was recorded in 1630 by Bernardino Faino, who called it a "beautiful and delicate thing". It was also recorded in its original location in 1660 by Francesco Paglia and in 1700 by Giulio Antonio Averoldi, with the latter calling it an "incomparible panel [...] in the taste of Raphael". The last source to record it on this site is an 1834 guidebook by Alessandro Sala, whilst the first to record it in its present position is Federico Odorici in 1853. There it replaced a painting by Callisto Piazza which had transferred to the Lechi collection and is now in Milan's Pinacoteca di Brera, which acquired it in 1829.

== Bibliography (in Italian) ==
- Giulio Antonio Averoldi, Le scelte pitture di Brescia additate al forestiere, Brescia 1700
- Paolo Brognoli, Nuova Guida di Brescia, Brescia 1826
- Camillo Boselli, Il Moretto, 1498-1554, in "Commentari dell'Ateneo di Brescia per l'anno 1954 - Supplemento", Brescia 1954
- Joseph Archer Crowe, Giovanni Battista Cavalcaselle, A history of painting in North Italy, Londra 1871
- Bernardino Faino, Catalogo Delle Chiese riuerite in Brescia, et delle Pitture et Scolture memorabili, che si uedono in esse in questi tempi, Brescia 1630
- Stefano Fenaroli, Dizionario degli artisti bresciani, Brescia 1877
- Roberto Longhi, Cose bresciane del Cinquecento, in "L'arte", anno 20, Brescia 1917
- Giorgio Nicodemi, Per un libro sul Romanino, in "L'arte", anno 29, Brescia 1926
- Federico Odorici, Storie Bresciane dai primi tempi sino all'età nostra, Brescia 1853
- Francesco Paglia, Il Giardino della Pittura, Brescia 1660
- Pier Virgilio Begni Redona, Alessandro Bonvicino - Il Moretto da Brescia, Editrice La Scuola, Brescia 1988
- Adolfo Venturi, Storia dell'arte italiana, volume IX, La pittura del Cinquecento, Milano 1929
