= San Giorgio, Brescia =

Roman Catholic church in Italy

Coordinates: 45.5410363°N 10.2212492°E

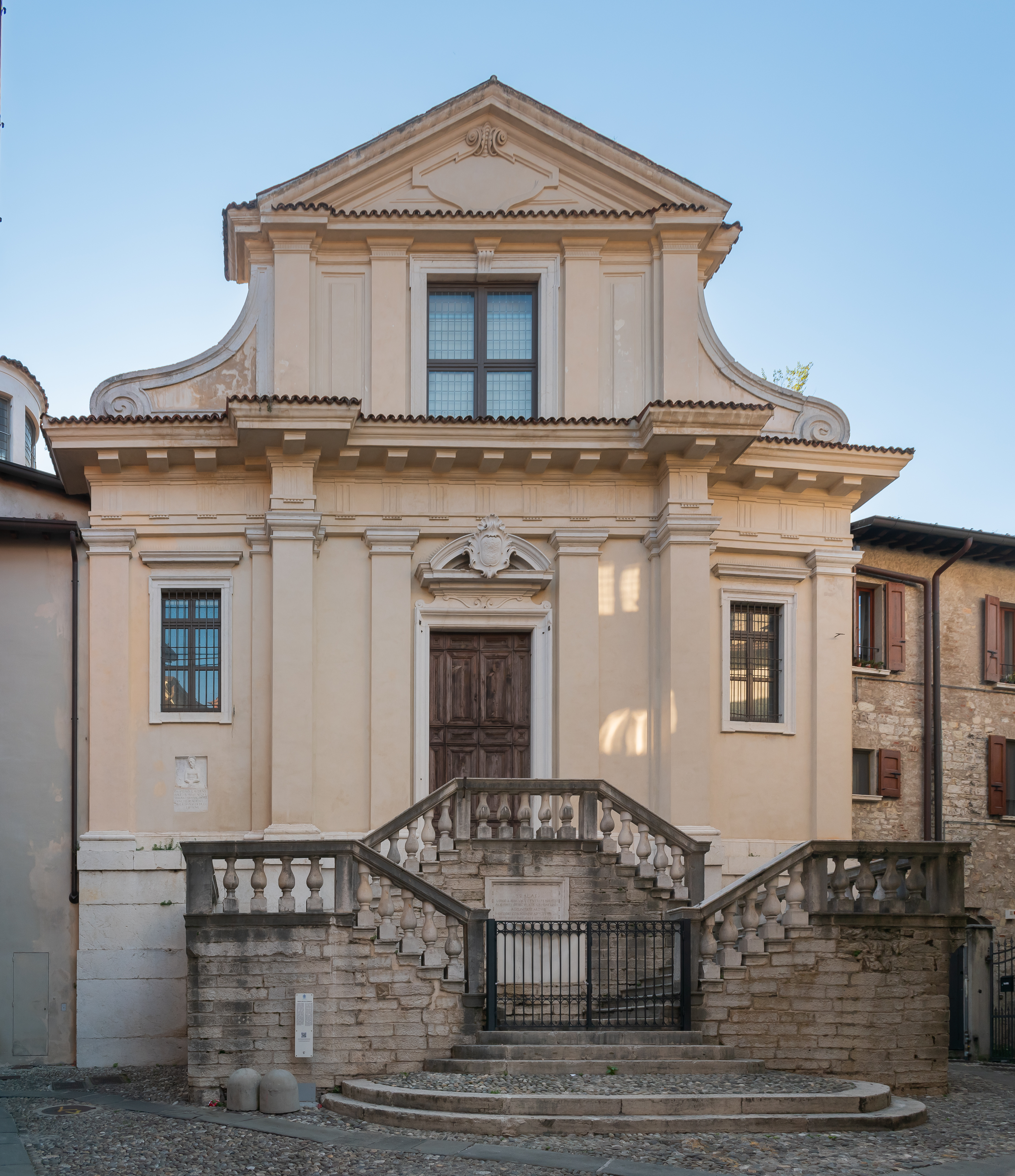
San Giorgio

San Giorgio is a Roman Catholic church located on the Piazza of the same name, just outside Porta Bruciata, in Brescia, region of Lombardy, Italy.

== History ==
A church at the site is documented since 775. In 1218, Franciscan friars erected a nearby monastery and were in possession of the church. But by 1254, they had moved to the convent and church of San Francesco. By 1429, this parish church was in a dilapidated state, and a major restoration, including present facade occurred in 1639.

An inventory of works in 1826 noted to right of nave an oil painting depicting a Nativity, by Giovita Bresciano, a pupil of Lattanzio Gambara. The main altarpiece depicted was by a young Gandini and two side-panels depicting St George and the Dragon and a Martyrdom of St George by Pompeo Ghitti.

In addition, in the chapels on the left of the nave, there was a Virgin with Saints Francis of Paola and Leonard, by Giovanni Battista Pittoni. A canvas depicting Virgin with Francis of Sales and St Catherine was attributed to Domenico Carretti. A Sacred Heart of Jesus was attributed to Antonio Dusi. A Dead Christ with St Charles is attributed to Savani. In the sacristy are some frescoes from the original romanesque church. Saint George and the Princess by Cicognara also originated in the church.

The church also contains 13th century frescoes including a Christ Pantocrater. The nave ceiling was decorated by Pietro Sorisene and Pompeo Ghitti with architectural decoration by Agostino Avanzo. The apse ceiling has a depiction of the Seven Angels of the Apocalypse by Ottavio Amigoni. The exterior of the apse still betrays the Romanesque architecture of the original church.
