= Domenico Carretti =

Italian painter

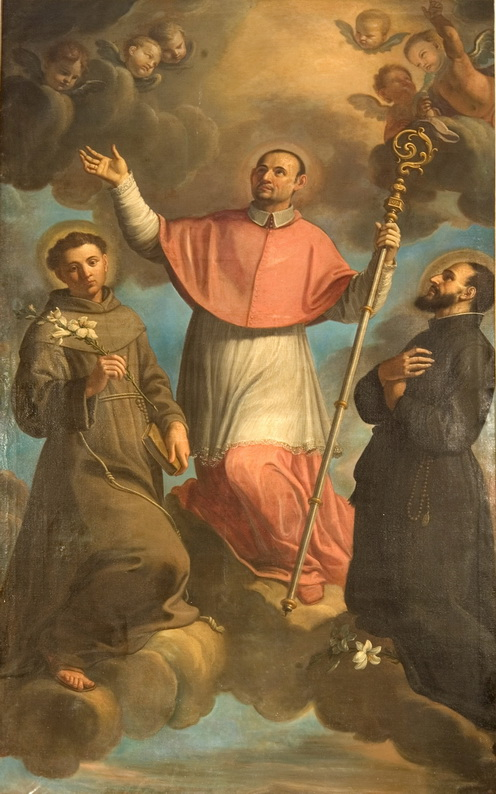
Altarpiece with the Saints Charles Borromeo, Anthony of Padua, and Gaetano dei Conti di Thiene

Domenico Carretti (c. 1650-c. 1719) was an Italian painter, born in Bologna, and active mainly at Brescia. He painted a Virgin with the Infant Jesus and St. Theresa for the church of San Pietro in Oliveto in Brescia.
