= Christ and the Angel =

Painting by Moretto da Brescia

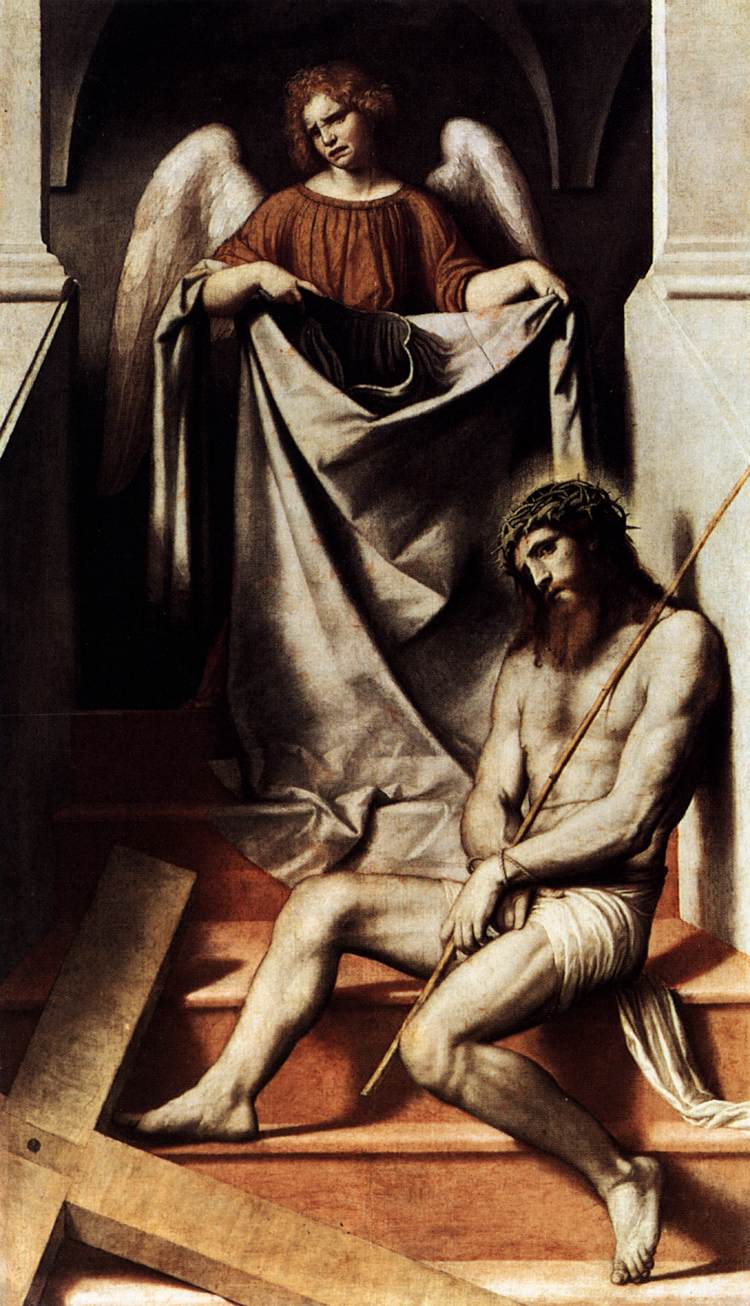
Christ and the Angel (c. 1550) by Moretto da Brescia

Christ and the Angel is an oil on canvas painting by Moretto da Brescia, executed c. 1550, now in the Pinacoteca Tosio Martinengo in Brescia. In 1630 Bernardino Faino recorded it "in the Capella della Santissima Croce d'oro et fiamma" in Brescia's Old Cathedral. It was restored in 1914 and 1935.
