= Saint Matthew and the Angel (Savoldo) =

Painting by Giovanni Girolamo Savoldo

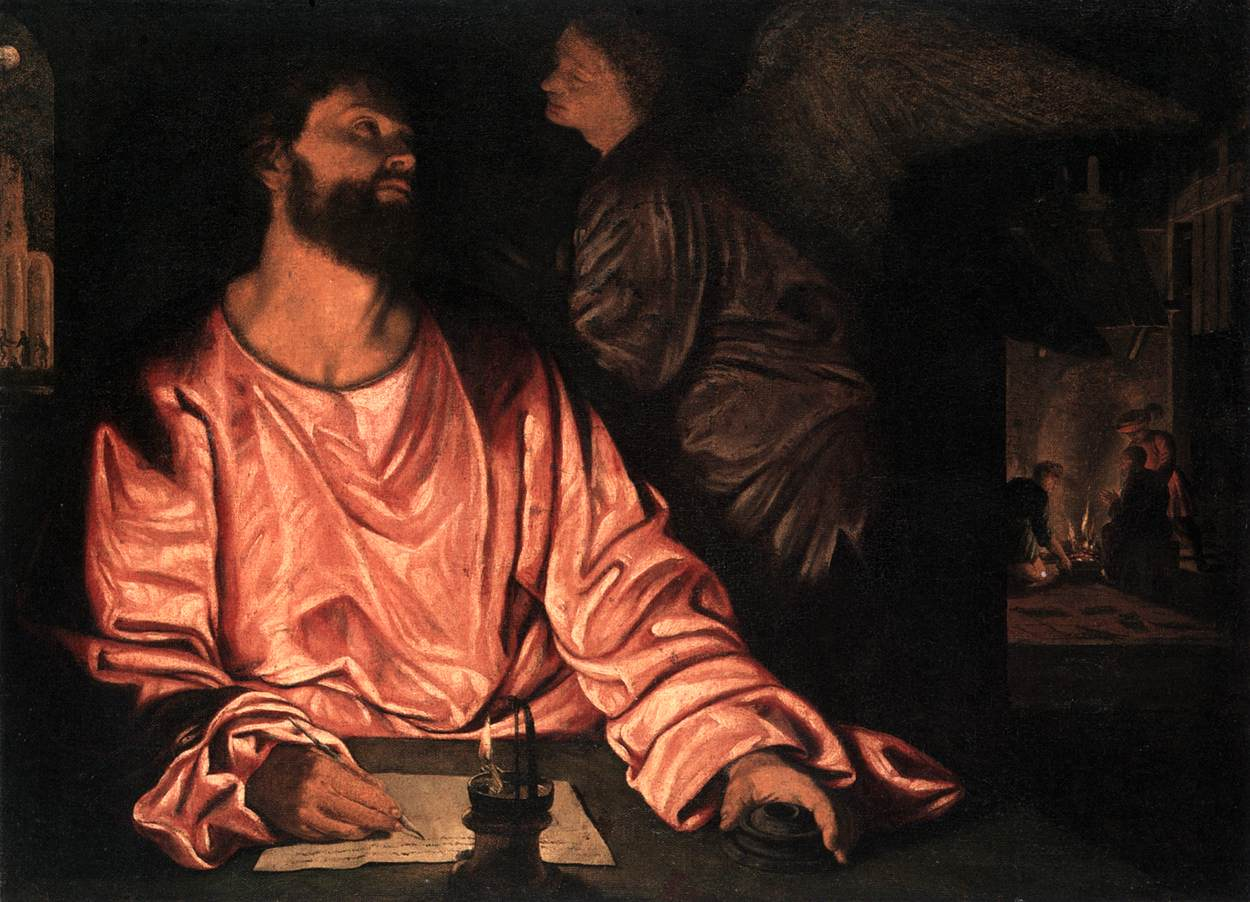
Saint Matthew and the Angel (c. 1530-1535) by Savoldo

Saint Matthew and the Angel is an oil on canvas painting by Giovanni Gerolamo Savoldo, executed c. 1530-1535, depicting Saint Matthew, now in the Metropolitan Museum of Art, in New York. It was a major influence on the young Caravaggio.

Originally produced for a private 'studiolo' or for the Zecca in Milan, it is one of the nocturnes for which Savoldo is most famous. X-ray photography shows a drawing of a woman on the right half.
