= Francesco Ricchino =

Italian architect

Francesco Ricchino was an Italian architect of the Renaissance period, born in Rovato and mainly active in his native Brescia.

== Biography ==
He was a pupil of Alessandro Bonvicino. He painted scenes for the chancel of the church of San Pietro in Oliveto in Brescia. He is known also as a poet. The biographer Cristiani describes him as an architect working for the Elector of Saxony. He cites two sources claiming he died after may 1571 (Three letter to Hippolito Chizzola in the archives of Fam.Ducco, march and may 1571, Brescia).
