= San Barnaba, Brescia =

Church in Brescia, Italy

Coordinates: 45.5357°N 10.2262°E

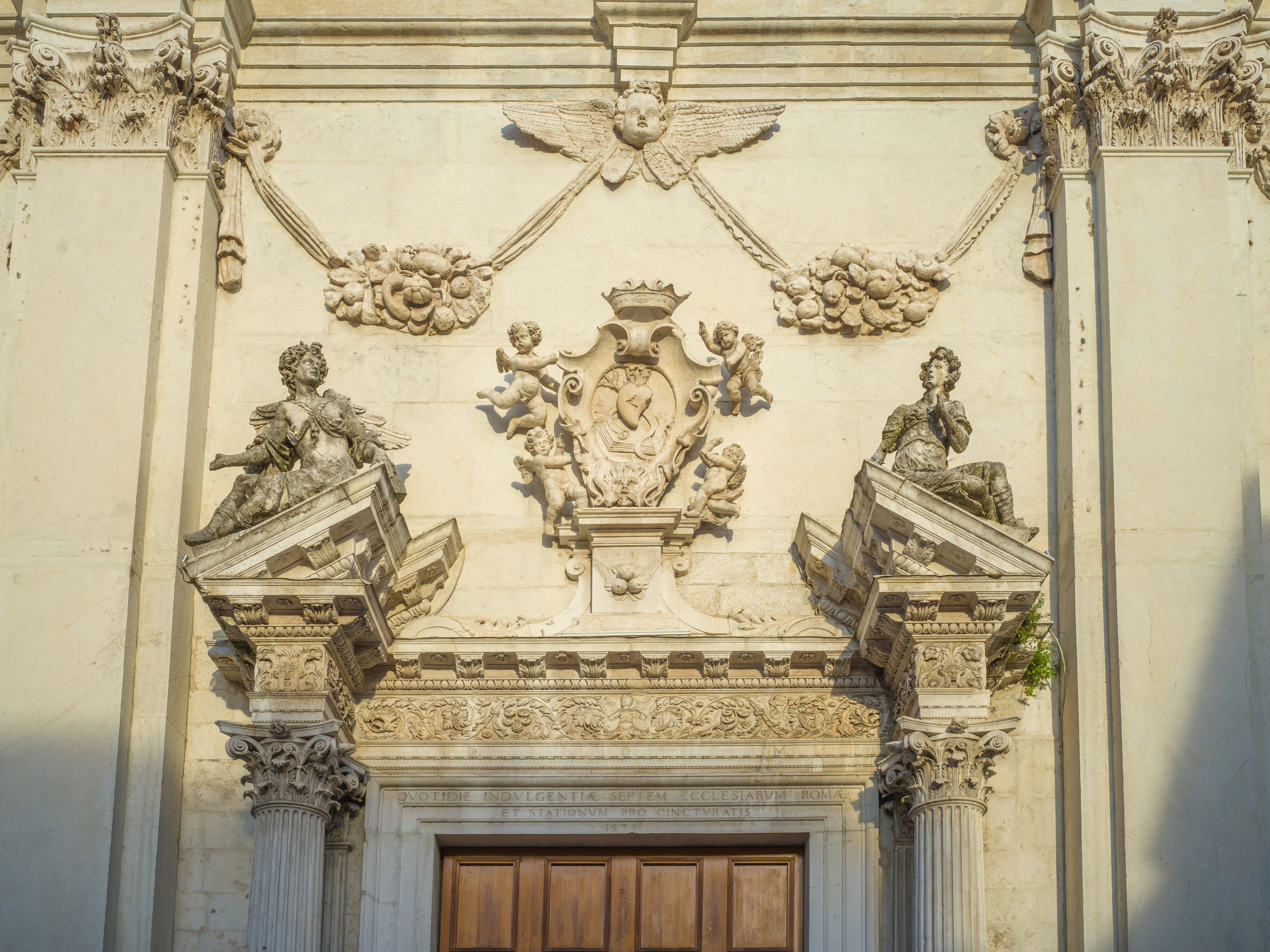
Detail of the main portal to the San Barnaba church

San Barnaba is a deconsecrated Baroque-style, Roman Catholic church, located on Corso Magenta #44, near Piazzale Arnaldo, in Brescia, region of Lombardy, Italy. The church in the 20th century became an auditorium (Auditorium San Barnaba) and conference hall, and home of the Conservatorio Luca Marenzio.

== History ==
The church was originally built in 1299 under the patronage of the Bishop Berardo Maggi. It is said the church was erected atop a pagan temple to Hercules. By 1302 it was affiliated with an Augustinian order convent. The Augustinians were expelled from Brescia in 1457, and replaced by a Comunità dell’Osservanza di Lombardia, which in 1490 performs reconstructions including adding an adjacent library, where Giovanni Pietro da Cemmo frescoed the Life of St Augustine on the ceiling. Angela Merici, later canonized as saint, who lived in the neighborhood attended mass frequently in this church. It is said that while praying during the blessing of the eucharist in this church, she would experience levitation.

== Interiors ==
The present church was rebuilt starting in 1623. The order affiliated with the convent was expelled in 1797. An inventory from 1823 of the church, noted the following works remained: By Paolo Brognoli

- St Augustine at the helm of a ship (1689) by Luca Martelli
- Four canvases by Pompeo Ghitti
  - Conversion of St Augustine by the voice of an Angel
  - St Ambrose baptizes St Augustine
  - St Simpliciano grants St Augustine the habit of a monk
  - St Augustine blesses a Bishop
- Dead Christ (first altar on right, anonymous)
- Madonna di Buon consiglio (19th century. anonymous)
- Miracle of St John of San Facondo Eremitano by Panfili
- Nativity by Girolamo Savoldo
- St Charles Borromeo by Bernardino Gandino (above tomb of Alessandro Luzzago)
- Resurrection of Christ attributed to Marone or Bagnadore
- Martyrdom of St Baranabas (main altarpiece) signed Josephus Pamphilus
- Guardian Angel by anonymous painter
- Virgin of the Belt, statue by Avogadro, surrounding frescoes by Lucchese
- St Mary of Egypt dispenses charity (Altar of the Virgin of the Belt) by Giuseppe Amatori
- St Mary of Egypt taken to Burial by Grazio Cossale
- Apostle Barnabas between saints Augustine and Monica by Pietro Muttoni
- St Claire by Francesco Paglia
- St Roch and St Sebastian (chapel of San Nicolo da Tolentino) by Vincenzo Civerchio
- Coena Domini (Sacristy) by Vincenzo Foppa
- Crucifixion with Mary, St John Evangelist and other Saints by Cossale
- Christ venerated by St Augustine and other Saints by Antonio Gandino
- Christ on the Road to Calvary by Marone
