= Floriano Ferramola =

Italian painter

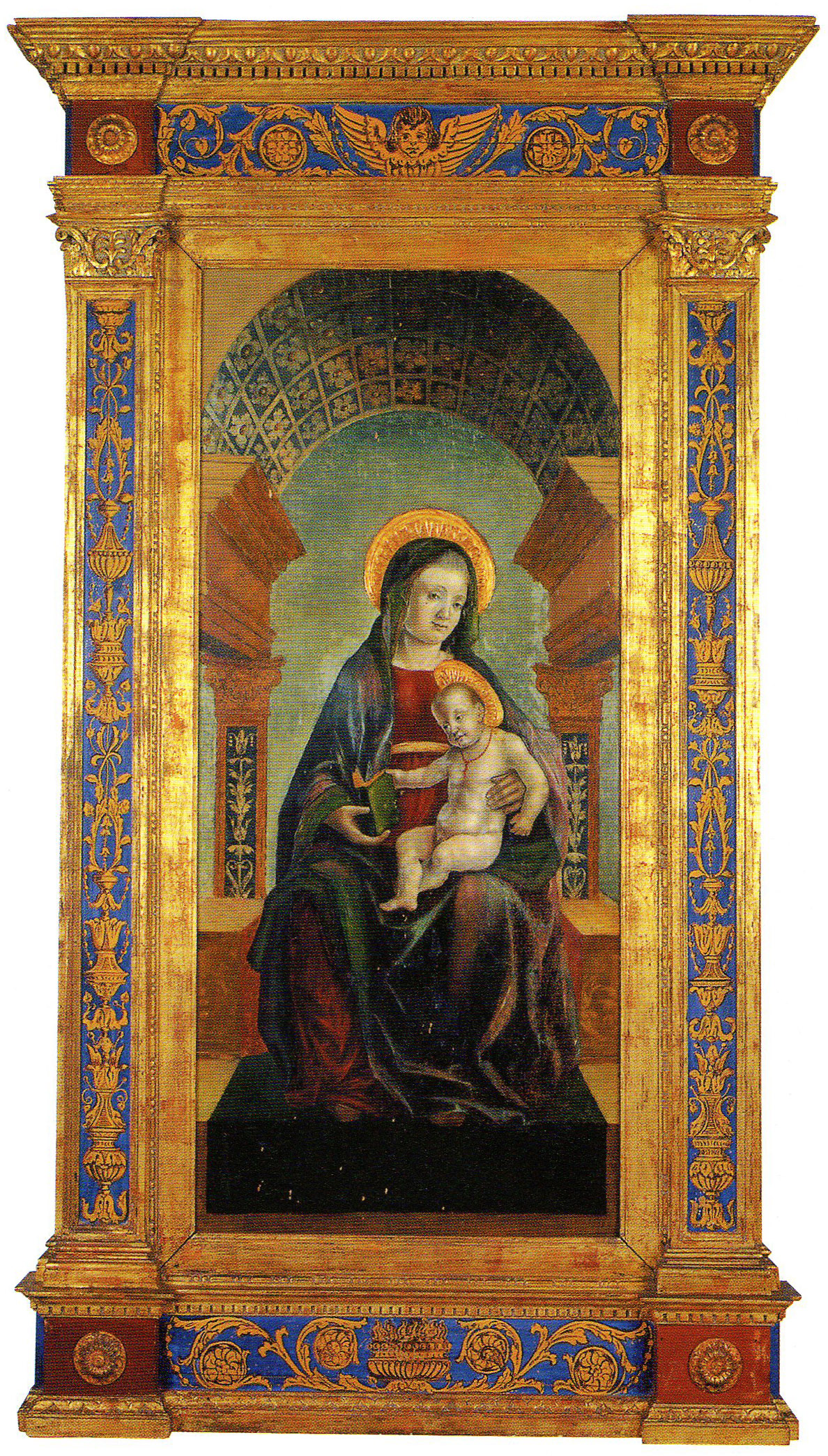
Madonna Enthroned with Child, early 16th century. Bishop's Palace, Brescia.

Floriano or Fioravante Ferramola (c. 1478 – 3 July 1528) was an Italian painter of the Renaissance period, active mainly in Brescia.

== Biography ==
Mentioned for the first time in 1503, his first known work is a Nativity from 1507 to 1508, now in the Civi Museums of Pavia; in 1512 he painted a portrait of Gaston de Foix, after being spared by the latter from the massacre of the population of Brescia after conquering the city.
Later Ferramola frescoed an Annunciation for the church of the Carmine in Brescia, and also painted for the church of Santa Maria delle Grazie in Brescia. He is also known for his frescoes painted for the Palazzo Calini in Brescia, one of which may be viewed in London at the Victoria and Albert Museum.

== Sources ==
- Farquhar, Maria (1855). Ralph Nicholson Wornum (ed.). Biographical catalogue of the principal Italian painters. London: Woodfall & Kinder. p. 59.
- Nicoli Cristiani, Federico (1807). Della Vita delle pitture di Lattanzio Gambara; Memorie Storiche aggiuntevi brevi notizie intorno a' più celebri ed eccelenti pittori Bresciani. Spinelli e Valgiti, Brescia. pp. 156–157.
