= San Pietro in Oliveto =

Catholic Church in lombardy Italy

Coordinates: 45.542386°N 10.229154°E

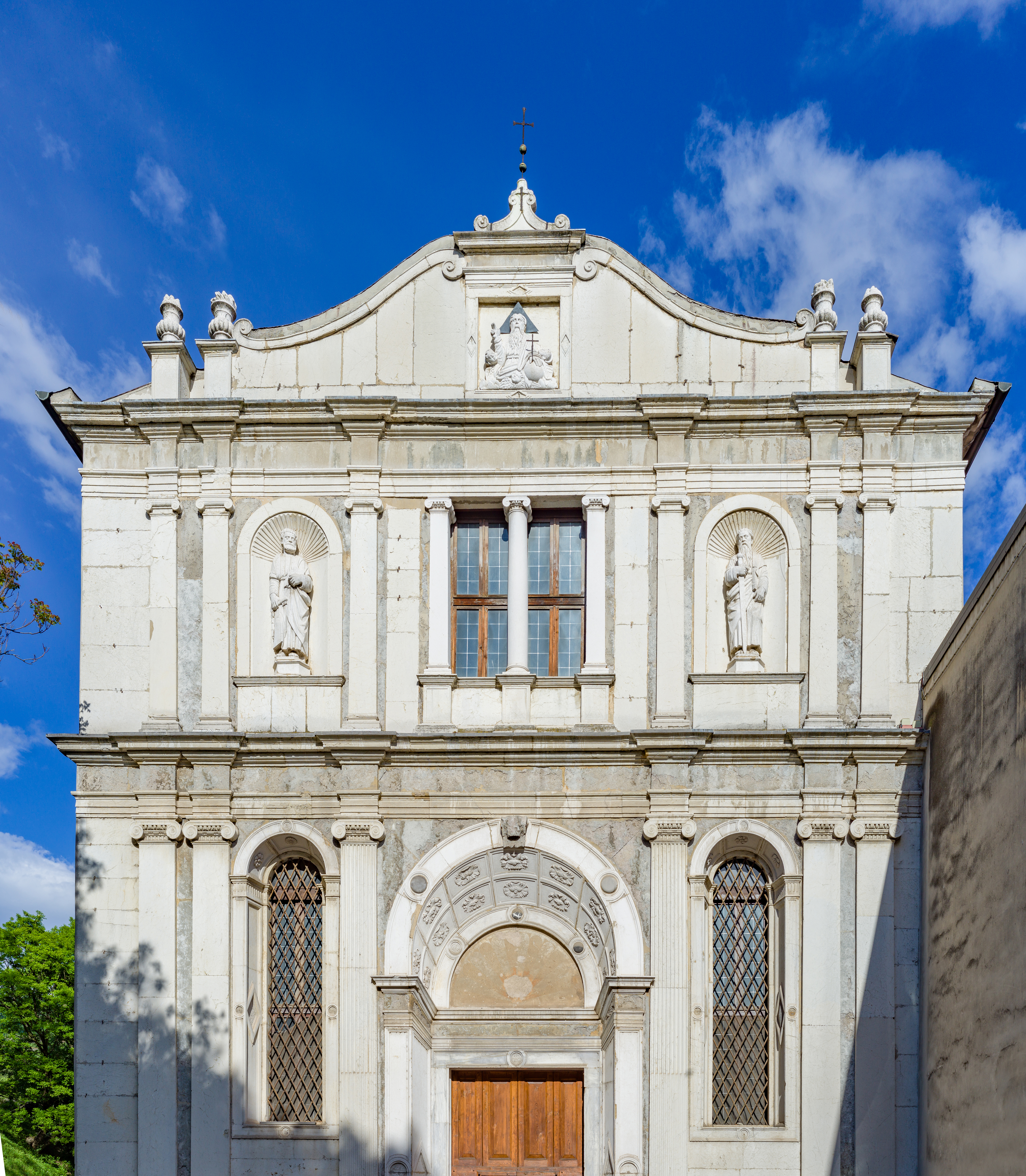
Facade

San Pietro in Oliveto is a Roman Catholic church located at the end of via del Castello in central Brescia, region of Lombardy, Italy.

== History ==
The church was founded in late 11th or early 12th-centuries, and began attached a Benedictine convent. The name was derived from the olive groves once on Cidneo hill. The convent was destroyed during a siege in 1433. In 1487, it was transferred to the Canons of San Giorgio in Alega of Venice, and reconstruction in the 16th century under the design of Antonio Medaglia. The order was suppressed in 1668, and it became property of a Carmelite order. These were expelled in 1799, and in 1805, it was made part of a seminary.

The altarpiece in the second altar on the left depicting St John of the Cross in contemplation is attributed to Giuseppe Tortelli.

An inventory from 1856 lists the following works:

- Virgin above San Lorenzo Giustiniani with St John the Evangelist and Holy Wisdom by Moretto da Brescia
- Scapular of the Carmelites carried by Angels by Francesco Paglia
- Adoration of the Magi attributed to Agostino Galeazzi
- Virgin and St Theresa of Avila by Domenico Carretti
- St Theresa praying before the Redeemer attributed to Bernardo Strozzi
- St Theresa in Ecstasy by Angelo Trevisano
- Saint Peter, with St Paul, receives the Keys to Heaven main altarpiece by Moretto da Brescia
- By Francesco Ricchino
  - Moses as an infant rescued from the Nile (1566) by
  - Moses defends the seven sons of Madian
  - Moses makes water flow from a stone
  - Moses and sunders the tablets of the law
  - Two Prophets over lateral door
  - Two Saints flanking lateral altar
- Two Miracles of St John of the Cross by Giuseppe Tortelli
- Victory of Christians led by fra Gesù Maria Carmelitano against the Duke of the Palatine of the Rhine in 1620 (presumably Battle of White Mountain) by Andrea Celesti
- Christ on the Road to Calvary, attributed to Foppa, Rossi, or Paolo Zoppo
- St Theresa and Jesus Child by Andrea Celesti
- St John of the Cross crowned by Jesus by Pompeo Ghitti
