= Saint George and the Princess (Cicognara) =

Painting by Antonio Cicognara

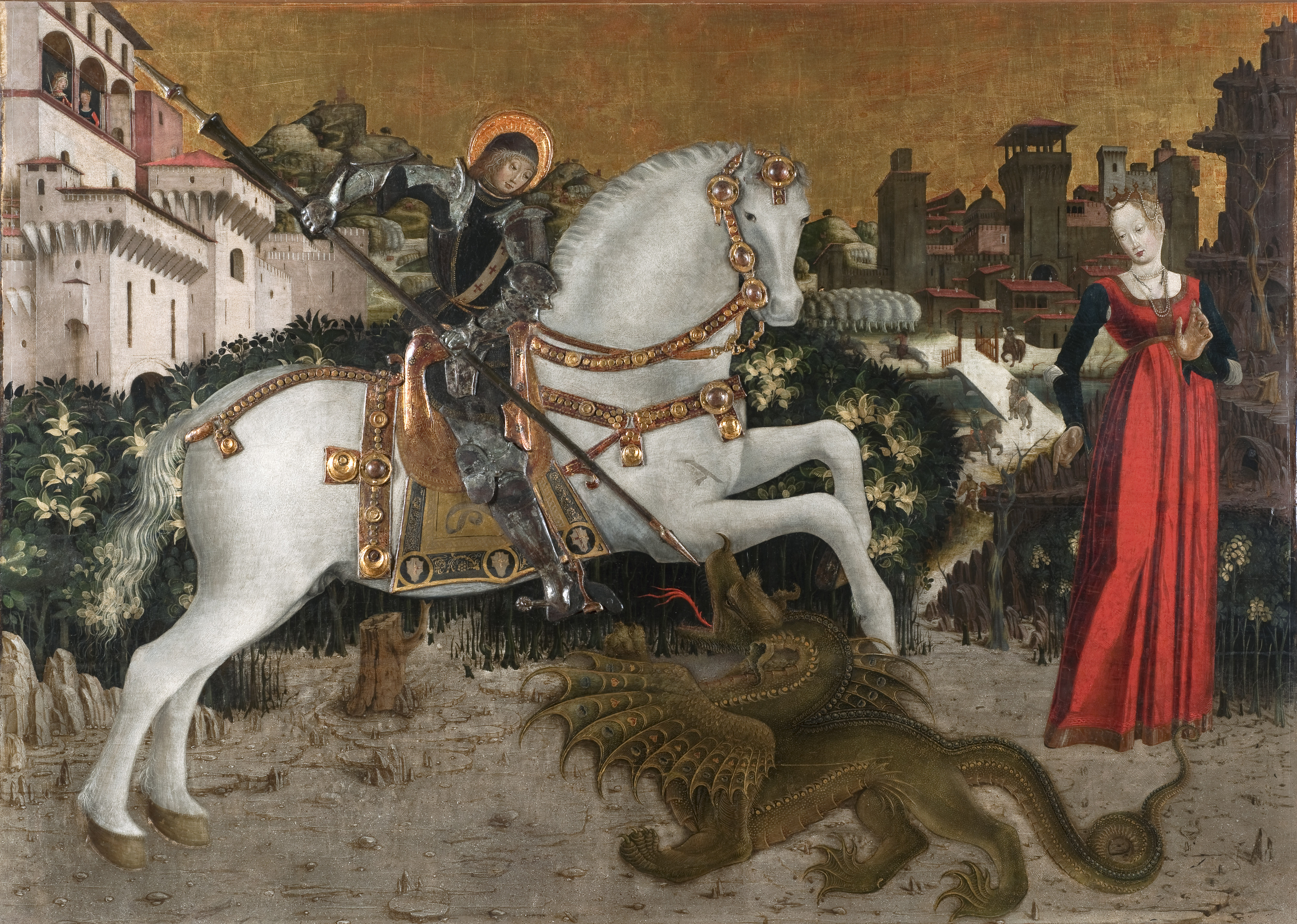

Saint George and the Princess is a late 15th century tempera on panel painting, attributed to Antonio Cicognara and now in the Pinacoteca Tosio Martinengo in Brescia.

It was originally in the church of San Giorgio and as such the commission is thought to have been from the Franciscans who then occupied the adjoining monastery. In 1797 the city's monasteries were suppressed by the Brescian Republic and San Giorgio's artworks were looted and dispersed within the city - most of them went to the city's Diocesan Museum, though Saint George entered its present collection in the 19th century.

== Bibliography ==
- (in Italian) Bruno Passamani, Guida della Pinacoteca Tosio-Martinengo di Brescia, Grafo, Brescia 1988
