= Bernardino da Martinengo =

Italian architect

Bernardino da Martinengo (mid-15 century in Martinengo – after 1501 in Brescia) was an Italian mason and architect. His appellation serves to identify his origins in Martinengo in the area of Bergamo. In 1481, he was cited as a member of a bricklayers group (paratico dei marangoni), where he learned construction techniques of the late Gothic. Towards the end of the same decade, he was registered amongst the construction workers of the Monte di Pietà vecchio, a palazzo situated in the Piazza della Loggia in Brescia, where he would be one of the accusers of Filippo Grassi, the construction manager, for fraud against the municipality.

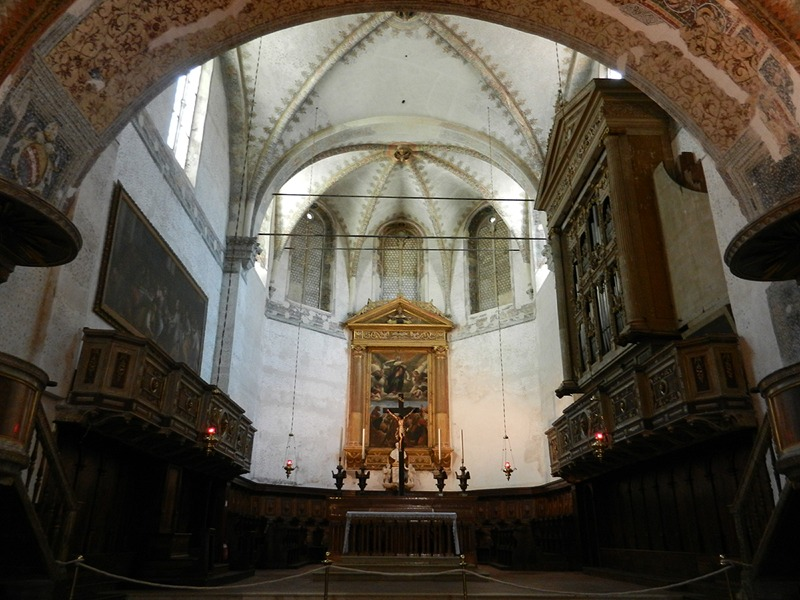
The Presbytery of the Old Cathedral, Brescia, constructed by Bernardo di Martinengo

In August 1490, he was commissioned for the construction of the new presbytery of the Old Cathedral, Brescia. He also extended the Romanesque choir in the building, and built the transept and the chapel of the Holy Crosses (now lost, after their remodelling in the 17th century). Between 1494-1495, he was involved in the construction of the Palazzo della Loggia, especially in the primary orders. In connection with this, he was sent to Padua and Venice to train himself up in structural and decorative solutions, which he would then apply to the new public building in Brescia.

Among the most interesting examples of Renaissance architecture in Brescia is the main cloister of the monastery of Saints Faustino and Giovita, which is the last known work of Bernardino, dated to 1501. No biographical evidence exists beyond this date.

== Bibliography ==
- Bollettario per le spese del Duomo. Biblioteca Queriniana, Brescia.
- Frati, Vasco; Gianfranceschi, Ida; Robecchi, Franco (1995). La Loggia di Brescia e la sua piazza. Evoluzione di un fulcro urbano nella storia di mezzo millennio. Vol. I. Brescia: Grafo.
- Guerrini, Paolo (1957). "Il paratico dei marangoni e la sua cappella nella chiesa di San Francesco". Memorie storiche della Diocesi di Brescia. Brescia.
- Peroni, Adriano (1963). "L'architettura e la scultura nei secoli XV e XVI". Storia di Brescia. Vol. II. Brescia.
- Zamboni, Baldassarre (1778). Memorie intorno alle fabbriche più insigni della città di Brescia. Brescia.
