= Antonio Cicognara =

Italian painter

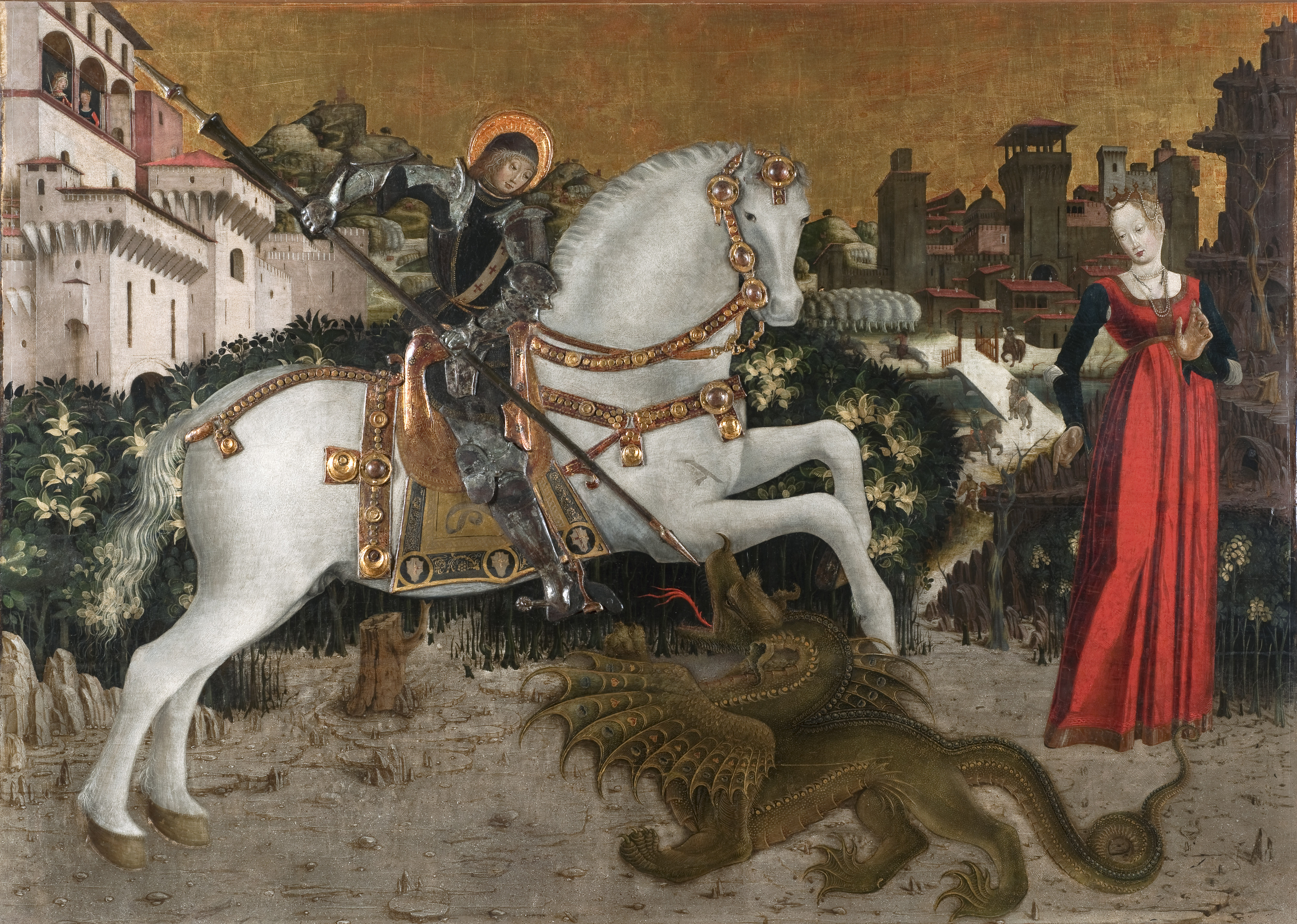
Saint George and the Princess

Antonio Cicognara (1480 – after 1500), was a 15th-century Italian painter.

== Biography ==
Little more is known of him than that he was born in Cremona and died in Ferrara. He is known for religious works.
