= Sack of Brescia =

- Part of the War of the League of Cambrai
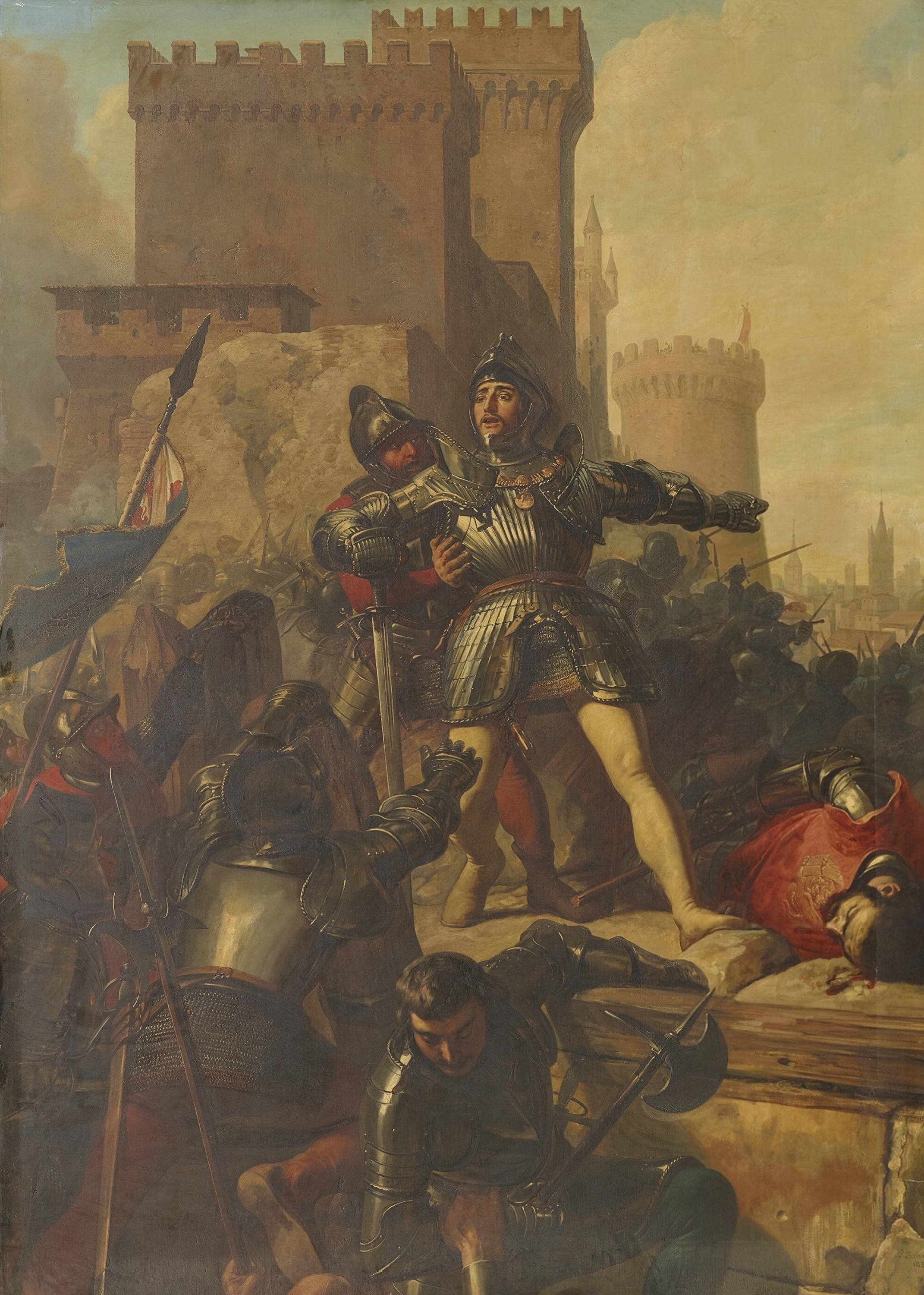
- 19th Century representation by Charles-Philippe Larivière
Date	18 February 1512
Location	Brescia, Italy
Result	French victory massacre of the population

Belligerents
Republic of Venice	Kingdom of France

Commanders and leaders
Andrea Gritti (POW); Francesco Contarini †; Luigi Avogadro †	Gaston of Foix; Charles III of Bourbon; Chevalier de Bayard; Jacques de La Palice

Strength
Unknown	12,000

Casualties and losses
between 6,000 and 15,000 massacred	heavy

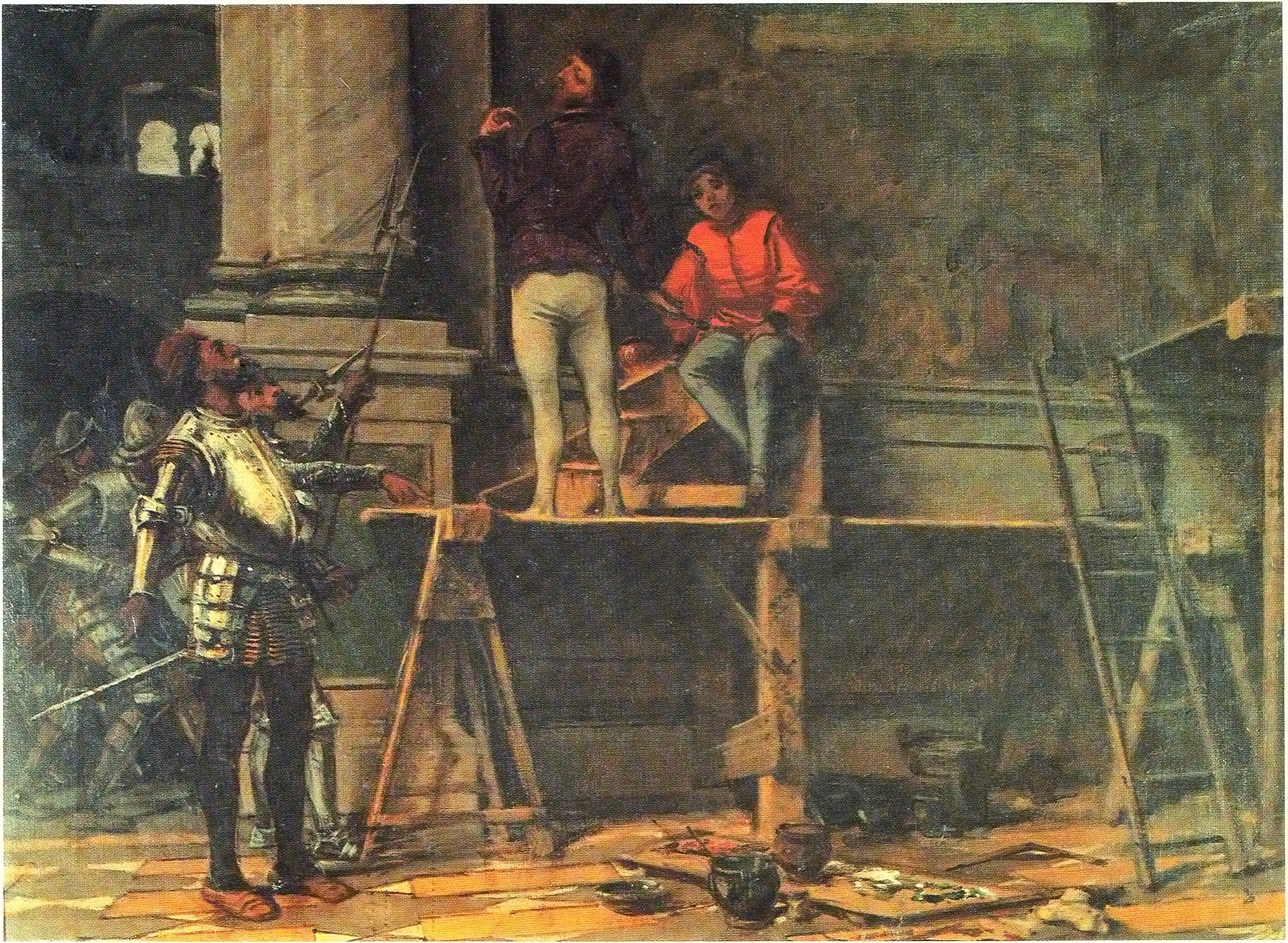
Floriano Ferramola refusing to abandon his work confronted with Gaston de Foix's troops. Painting by Modesto Faustini (1850s).

The Sack of Brescia took place on 18 February 1512, during the War of the League of Cambrai. It resulted in the massacre of the entire garrison and thousands of civilians.

== History ==
The city of Brescia had rebelled against French rule and was subsequently garrisoned by Venetian troops. Gaston of Foix, Duke of Nemours, recently arrived with the French armies in Italy, ordered the city to surrender; when it refused, they attacked.

The French attack took place in torrential rain on a muddy field. Gaston ordered his men to remove their shoes for a better grip. The defenders inflicted heavy casualties on the French, but the French entered the city anyhow.

Gascon infantry and Landsknechts proceeded to sack the city, massacring thousands of civilians over the next five days. The French soldiers even disregarded places of worship, massacring both the clergy and the civilian population who had sought refuge there.

Two of the survivors were the young Nicolo Tartaglia, who was wounded in the throat and left with a speech impediment, and the painter Floriano Ferramola, who was saved by Gaston of Foix personally, on the condition that he made a painting of him.

The Venetian commander and future Doge Andrea Gritti was also spared and imprisoned in the Sforza Castle in Milan, until November 1512, when an alliance between France and Venice was formed.

To avoid a similar fate, the city of Bergamo paid the French approximately 60,000 ducats.

Brescia remained under French control until its return to the Republic of Venice in 1520.

== Sources ==
- Norwich, John Julius (2004). Historia de Venecia. Editorial Almed. ISBN 84-931194-7-4.
- Baumgartner, Frederic J. (1994). Louis XII. New York: St. Martin's Press. ISBN 0-312-12072-9.
- Muratori, Ludovico Antonio. Annali d'Italia. Vol. IV. p. 293.
