= Francesco Paglia =

Italian painter (1636 – c. 1714)

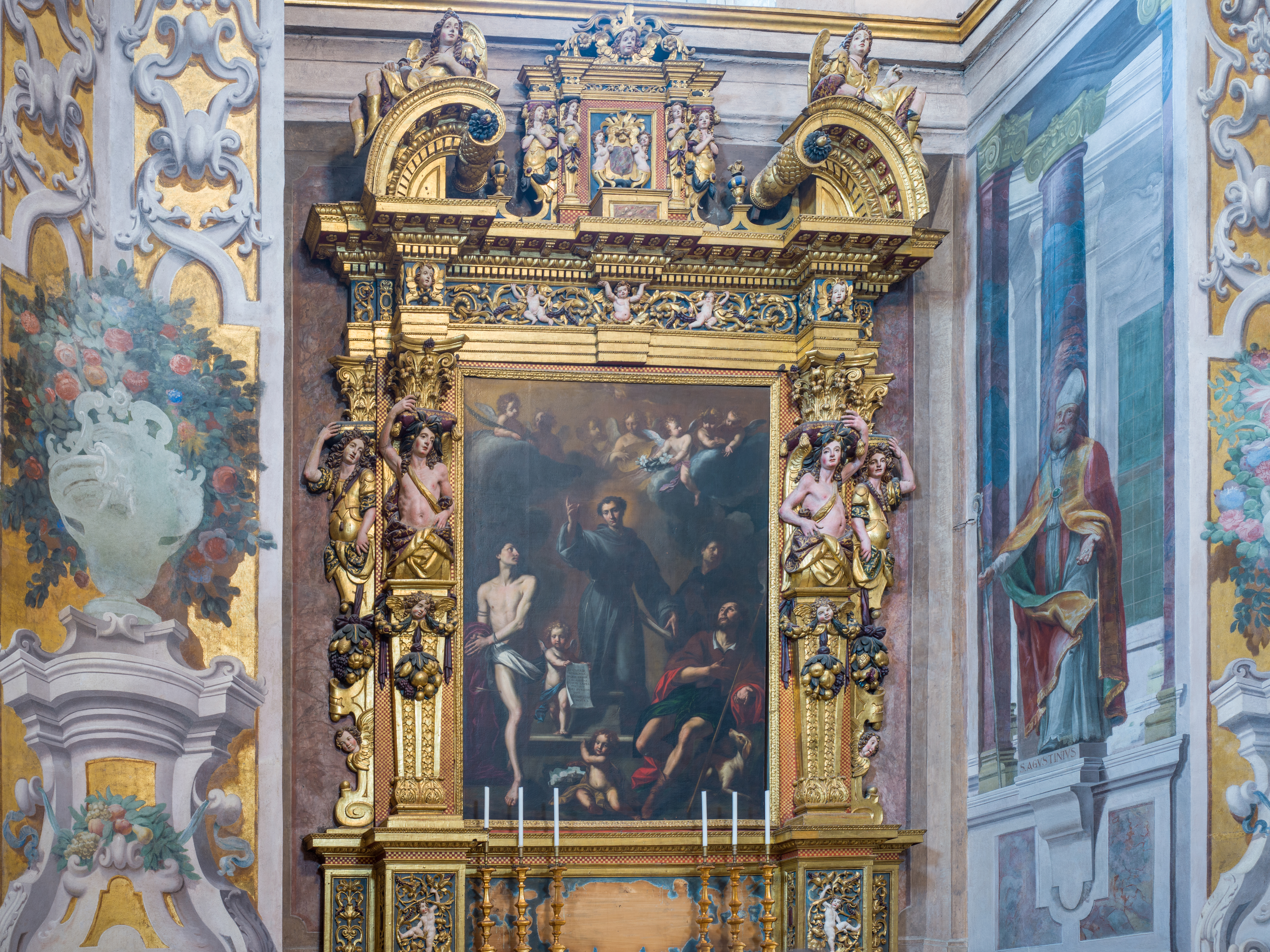
Altar by Francesco Paglia with the saints Sebastian, Anthony, and Roch in the Santa Maria della Carità church in Brescia

Francesco Paglia (1636 – c. 1714) was an Italian painter of the late-Baroque period, mainly active in Brescia.

== Biography ==
He was a pupil of Guercino. He also wrote a description of paintings in Brescia, using both prose and poetry, titled il Giardino della Pittura (The Garden of Painting). A copy of the manuscript was in the hands of the Avogadro family, which was known for their local patronage. Paglia also painted a St. Onofrio in the desert for the church of San Barnaba.

He had two sons, Antonio (1680- 9 February 1747) and Angelo (born 1681), both painters. Antonio moved to Venice after the death of his father to study with Sebastiano Ricci. Angelo also learned to sculpt in clay from the Brescian Santo Calegari.
