= Madonna and Child with Four Saints =

Madonna and Child with Four Saints may refer to:

- Madonna and Child with Four Saints (Moretto), a c. 1543 painting by Moretto da Brescia
- Madonna and Child with Four Saints (Titian), a c. 1520 painting by Titian

== See also ==
- Madonna and Child with Four Saints and Donor, a 1507 painting by Giovanni Bellini
- Madonna and Child with Saints
