= Saint Anthony Abbot (disambiguation) =

Saint Anthony Abbot or Anthony the Great was an Egyptian Christian saint of the 3rd–4th centuries, one of the Desert Fathers.

Saint Anthony Abbot may also refer to:

- Saint Anthony Abbot (Correggio), a painting of c. 1517–1518 by Correggio
- Saint Anthony Abbot (Pontormo), a painting of c. 1519 by Pontormo
- Saint Anthony Abbot (Moretto), a painting of 1530–1534 by Moretto da Brescia
- Saint Anthony Abbot (Preti), a painting of c. 1628 by Mattia Preti

== See also ==
- Category: Paintings of Anthony the Great
- Antoninus of Sorrento, a 7th-century abbot and saint
