= Madonna and Child with Four Doctors of the Church =

c. 1540 painting by Moretto da Brescia

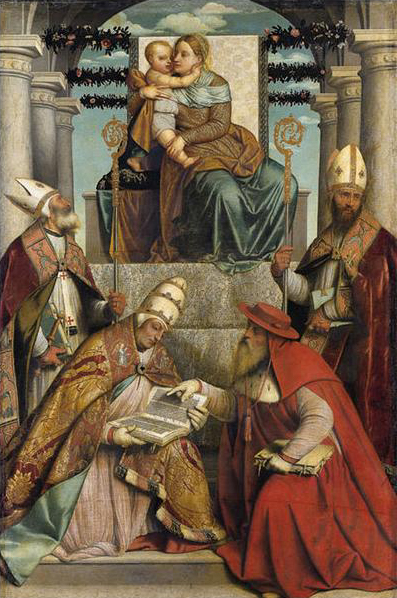
Madonna and Child with Four Doctors of the Church (1540-1545) by Moretto da Brescia

Madonna and Child with Four Doctors of the Church is an oil on canvas painting by Moretto da Brescia, created between 1540 and 1545.It is now housed in the Städelsches Kunstinstitut in Frankfurt. From left to right it shows Saint Ambrose (standing, looking at the Madonna), Gregory the Great, Saint Jerome (both sitting) and Augustine of Hippo (standing, looking to the right).

The work was first recorded in Santi Ambrogio e Carlo al Corso, the national church of the Lombards in Rome, where it was mentioned for the first time by Filippo Titi during the second half of the 17th century, though he misattributed it to Pordenone or Titian. It is not known when it was moved to that church, which was built from 1612 onwards - in 1943 György Gombosi theorised that it had been given to the church by the Ottoboni family, though he did not cite his sources for that hypothesis However, the Ottoboni family was Venetian in origin and had no known contact with Moretto - the only one of them ever in Brescia was Pietro Ottoboni between 1654 and 1664, long after the painter's death. Gombosi probably therefore interpreted ambiguous sources referring to the Ottoboni owning other Moretto works such as Madonna of Mount Carmel and the Madonna of Mercy Standard.

The work is mentioned in documents several times between Titi and 1835, when Passavant records that it had been sold in 1796 to the Roman art dealer Doppieri for 300 scudi and subsequently to Joseph Fesch, uncle of Napoleon I, for 3000 or 4000 scudi. It was taken to Paris but returned to Rome in 1845 to be auctioned with the rest of the Fesch collection. At that auction it was acquired by its present owner for around 70,000 lire. The sale became known throughout Italy and led Federico Odorici to comment that the injustice towards Moretto that had consumed Italy, where the work had been sold for only 300 scudi, had been compensated for by foreigners who had bought it for so great a sum.

== Bibliography ==
- (in Italian) Camillo Boselli, Il Moretto, 1498-1554, in "Commentari dell'Ateneo di Brescia per l'anno 1954 - Supplemento", Brescia 1954
- (in Italian) Rossana Bossaglia, La pittura bresciana del Cinquecento. I maggiori e i loro scolari in AA. VV., Storia di Brescia, Treccani, Brescia 1963
- Joseph Archer Crowe, Giovanni Battista Cavalcaselle, A history of painting in North Italy, Londra 1871
- (in Italian) Pietro Da Ponte, L'opera del Moretto, Brescia 1898
- (in Italian) Gustavo Frizzoni, La Pinacoteca comunale Martinengo in Brescia in "Archivio storico dell'arte", Brescia 1889
- György Gombosi, Moretto da Brescia, Basel 1943
- (in Italian) Valerio Guazzoni, Moretto. Il tema sacro, Brescia 1981
- Johann David Passavant, Tour of a German Artist in England, Londra 1835
- (in Italian) Pier Virgilio Begni Redona, Alessandro Bonvicino – Il Moretto da Brescia, Editrice La Scuola, Brescia 1988
- (in Italian) Alexis François Rio, Leonardo da Vinci e la sua scuola, Milano 1856
- (in Italian) Filippo Titi, Studio di pittura, scultura, et Architettura nelle Chiese di Roma, Roma 1674
- (in Italian) Adolfo Venturi, Storia dell'arte italiana, volume IX, La pittura del Cinquecento, Milano 1929
