= Luzzago =

Luzzago is an Italian surname. Notable people with the surname include:

- Alessandro Luzzago (1897–1972), Italian nobleman and organizer of Catholic charities
- Marco Luzzago (1950–2022), Italian businessman

== See also ==
- Luzzago Altarpiece
- Luzzatto
