= Portrait of a Man (Moretto) =

1526 painting by Moretto da Brescia

- Ritratto virile a figura intera (Italian)
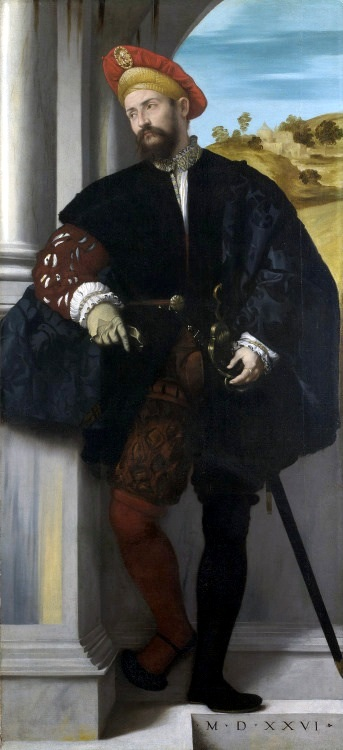
- Artist: Moretto
- Year: 1526
- Medium: Oil on canvas
- Dimensions: 201 cm × 92 cm (79 in × 36 in)
- Location: National Gallery, London

Portrait of a Man is an oil on canvas painting by Moretto da Brescia, dated of 1526, now in the National Gallery, London, which acquired it in 1876 from the Fenaroli Avogadro Collection, from Brescia. It is held to be the first surviving standing life-size portrait in art history, predating those of Titian.

== Bibliography ==
- (in Italian) Camillo Boselli, 'Il Moretto, 1498-1554', in Commentari dell'Ateneo di Brescia per l'anno 1954 – Supplemento, Brescia, 1954.
- (in Italian) Giovanni Battista Carboni, Le Pitture e Scolture di Brescia che sono esposte al pubblico con un'appendice di alcune private Gallerie, Brescia, 1760.
- (in Italian) Pietro Da Ponte, L'opera del Moretto, Brescia, 1898.
- György Gombosi, Moretto da Brescia, Basel, 1943.
- Cecil Gould, National Gallery catalogues. The sixteenth-century Italian schools (excluding the Venetian), London, 1962.
- Cecil Gould, The sixteenth-century Italian schools, London, 1975.
- (in Italian) Pier Virgilio Begni Redona, Alessandro Bonvicino – Il Moretto da Brescia, Brescia, Editrice La Scuola, 1988.
- (in Italian) Giorgio Vasari, Le vite de' più eccellenti pittori, scultori e architettori scritte da M. Giorgio Vasari pittore aretino – Con nuove annotazioni e commenti di Gaetano Milanesi, Firenze, 1881.
