= Moretto =

Moretto is a surname, and may refer to:

- Moretto, or Moretto da Brescia, (c. 1498–1554), Italian Renaissance painter (in his case Il Moretto was a nickname)
- Angie Moretto, NHL player
- Enrico Moretto, Italian fighter ace
- Graziella Moretto, actress
- Marcelo Moretto de Souza, Brazilian footballer
- Nelly Moretto, musician
- Luciano G. Moretto, nuclear physicist
- Sara Moretto, politician
