= Orzinuovi Altarpiece =

1528 painting by Moretto da Brescia

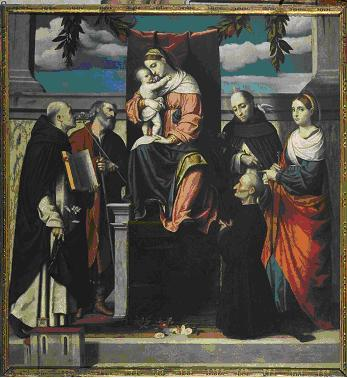
Orzinuovi Altarpiece (1525-1530) by Moretto da Brescia

The Orzinuovi Altarpiece or Enthroned Madonna and Child with Saints Dominic, Joseph, Vincent Ferrer, Lucy and a Commissioner is a 1525–1530 oil on canvas painting by Moretto da Brescia on the wall of the chancel of the church of San Domenico in Orzinuovi.

It dates to the artist's early mature years and may be identifiable with the work recorded in the parish church in the town by Francesco Paglia in 1675 as "a painting in which one can admire the Most Holy Virgin with the Christ-Child, St Peter and other saints, a singular work by Moretto". However, the subjects clearly refer to it being commissioned by the Dominicans, which seems to suggest that the work has always been in the church of San Domenico and that the work is not that mentioned by Paglia, with a temporary transfer to the parish church seemingly unlikely. The altarpiece also does not include Saint Peter – Paglia may have been confused the work with a painting in the parish church in Orzivecchi which does include St Peter, though this too seems unlikely. That work in Orzivecchi was for a time attributed to Moretto, but is now securely attributed instead to Giovanni Battista Moroni.

In Paglia's favour, art historians have always been uncertain in which saints are shown in the painting at San Domenico: in 1898 Pietro da Ponte identified "Saint Dominic" and "Saint Joseph" to the Madonna's left but identified those to her right as "Saint Bonaventure" and "Saint Catherine [of Alexandria]". Until 1936 it was referred to by Bernard Berenson generic title of "Madonna with Four Saints and a Donor", whilst later descriptions gave varied descriptions until Pier Virgilio Begni Redona finally resolved the issue in 1988 using the saints' attributes – Dominic has a star above his forehead and holds a lily and a book, Joseph holds a stick and a flowering staff, Vincent Ferrer carries a lily, has a dove on his shoulder and a flame above his head and Lucy holds an awl and two eyes.

== Bibliography ==
- Bernard Berenson, The North Italian Painters of the Renaissance, New York-London, 1907
- Bernard Berenson, The Italian Painters of the Renaissance, New York-London, 1927
- (in Italian) Pietro Da Ponte, L'opera del Moretto, Brescia 1898
- (in Italian) Stefano Fenaroli, Alessandro Bonvicino soprannominato il Moretto pittore bresciano. Memoria letta all'Ateneo di Brescia il giorno 27 luglio 1873, Brescia 1875
- (in Italian) Fausto Lechi, Gaetano Panazza, La pittura bresciana del Rinascimento, exhibition catalogue, Bergamo 1939
- (in Italian) Roberto Longhi, Cose bresciane del Cinquecento, in "L'arte", anno 20, Brescia 1917
- (in Italian) Francesco Paglia, Il Giardino della Pittura, Brescia 1675
- (in Italian) Pier Virgilio Begni Redona, Alessandro Bonvicino – Il Moretto da Brescia, Editrice La Scuola, Brescia 1988
