= Supper at Emmaus (Moretto) =

c. 1526 painting by Moretto da Brescia

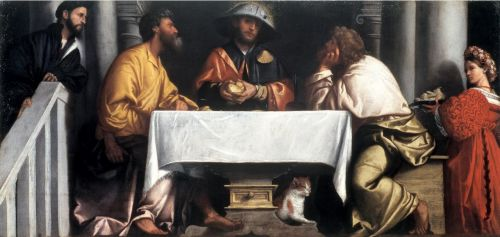
Supper at Emmaus (c. 1526) by Moretto da Brescia

Supper at Emmaus is an oil on canvas painting by Moretto da Brescia, executed c. 1526, now in the Pinacoteca Tosio Martinengo in Brescia. It was originally painted for the Church of San Luca in the city, where it was first recorded in 1630 by Bernardino Faino, who saw it in the San Sebastiano chapel.
