= St Anthony of Padua with Two Saints =

c. 1530 painting by Moretto da Brescia

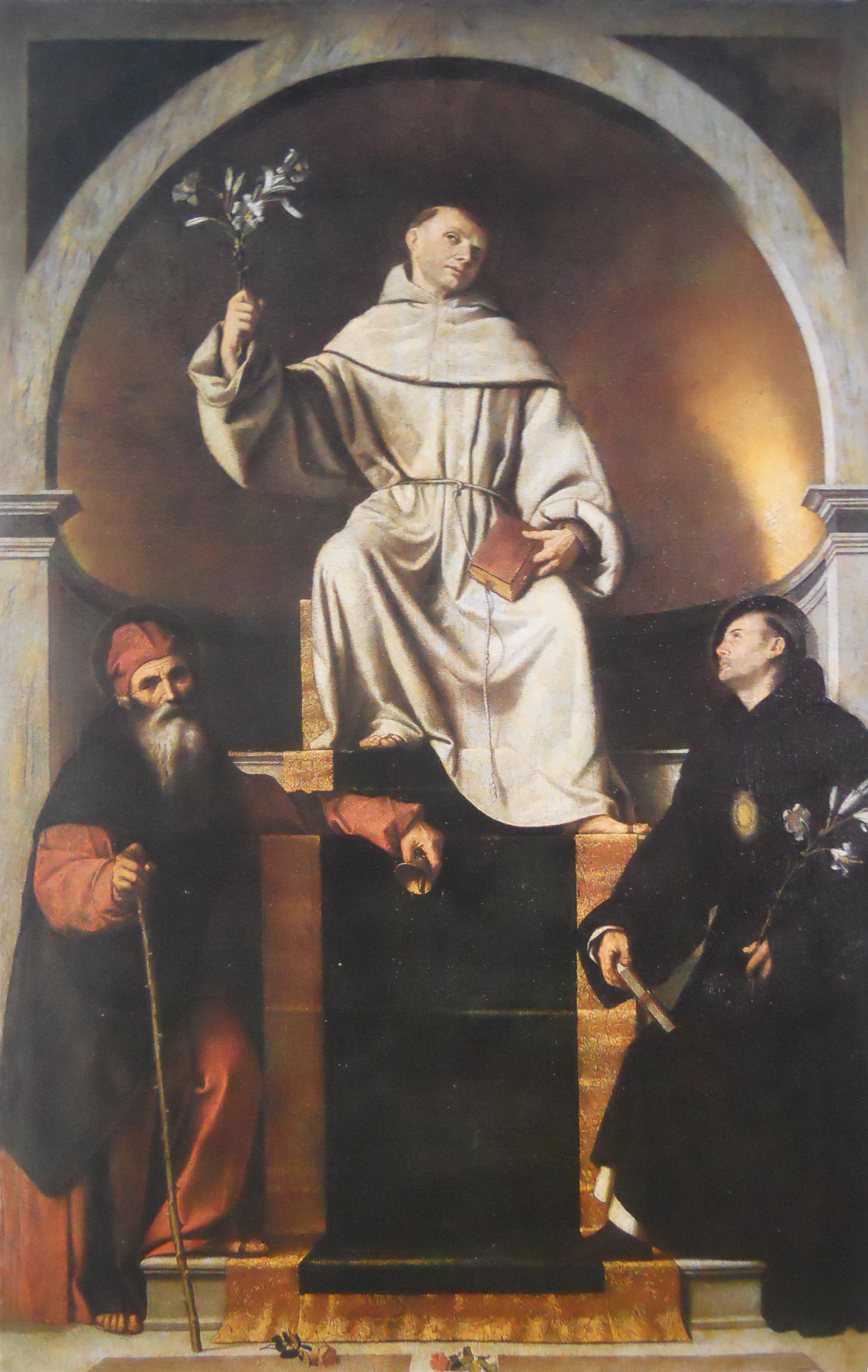
St Anthony of Padua with Two Saints by Moretto da Brescia

St Anthony of Padua with Two Saints is a c. 1530 oil on canvas painting by Moretto da Brescia, now in the Pinacoteca Tosio Martinengo in Brescia. The other two saints shown are Antony the Great and Nicholas of Tolentino.

It originated on a side altar in the city's church of Santa Maria delle Grazie and dates to Moretto's early mature period, showing marked similarities with his St Margaret of Antioch with Two Saints. Early in the 19th century, after the suppression of the adjoining monastery, ownership of the church temporarily passed to the city council, which at the end of that century transferred the painting to its present location and replaced by a 19th-century copy by Bortolo Schermini. This move occurred between 1882 (when it was recorded in its original location in a guidebook by Federico Odorici) and 1898 (when it is mentioned in the Pinacoteca in a monograph by Pietro Da Ponte).

== Bibliography (in Italian) ==
- Giulio Antonio Averoldi, Le scelte pitture di Brescia additate al forestiere, Brescia 1700
- Camillo Boselli, Il Moretto, 1498-1554, in "Commentari dell'Ateneo di Brescia per l'anno 1954 - Supplemento", Brescia 1954
- Joseph Archer Crowe, Giovanni Battista Cavalcaselle, A history of painting in North Italy, Londra 1871
- Pietro Da Ponte, L'opera del Moretto, Brescia 1898
- Bernardino Faino, Catalogo Delle Chiese riuerite in Brescia, et delle Pitture et Scolture memorabili, che si uedono in esse in questi tempi, Brescia 1630
- Valerio Guazzoni, Moretto. Il tema sacro, Brescia 1981
- Francesco Paglia, Il Giardino della Pittura, Brescia 1660
- Pier Virgilio Begni Redona, Alessandro Bonvicino - Il Moretto da Brescia, Editrice La Scuola, Brescia 1988
- Carlo Ridolfi, Le maraviglie dell'arte Ouero le vite de gl'illvstri pittori veneti, e dello stato. Oue sono raccolte le Opere insigni, i costumi, & i ritratti loro. Con la narratione delle Historie, delle Fauole, e delle Moralità da quelli dipinte, Brescia 1648
- Adolfo Venturi, Storia dell'arte italiana, volume IX, La pittura del Cinquecento, Milano 1929
