= Salvation Triptych =

Triptych by Moretto da Brescia

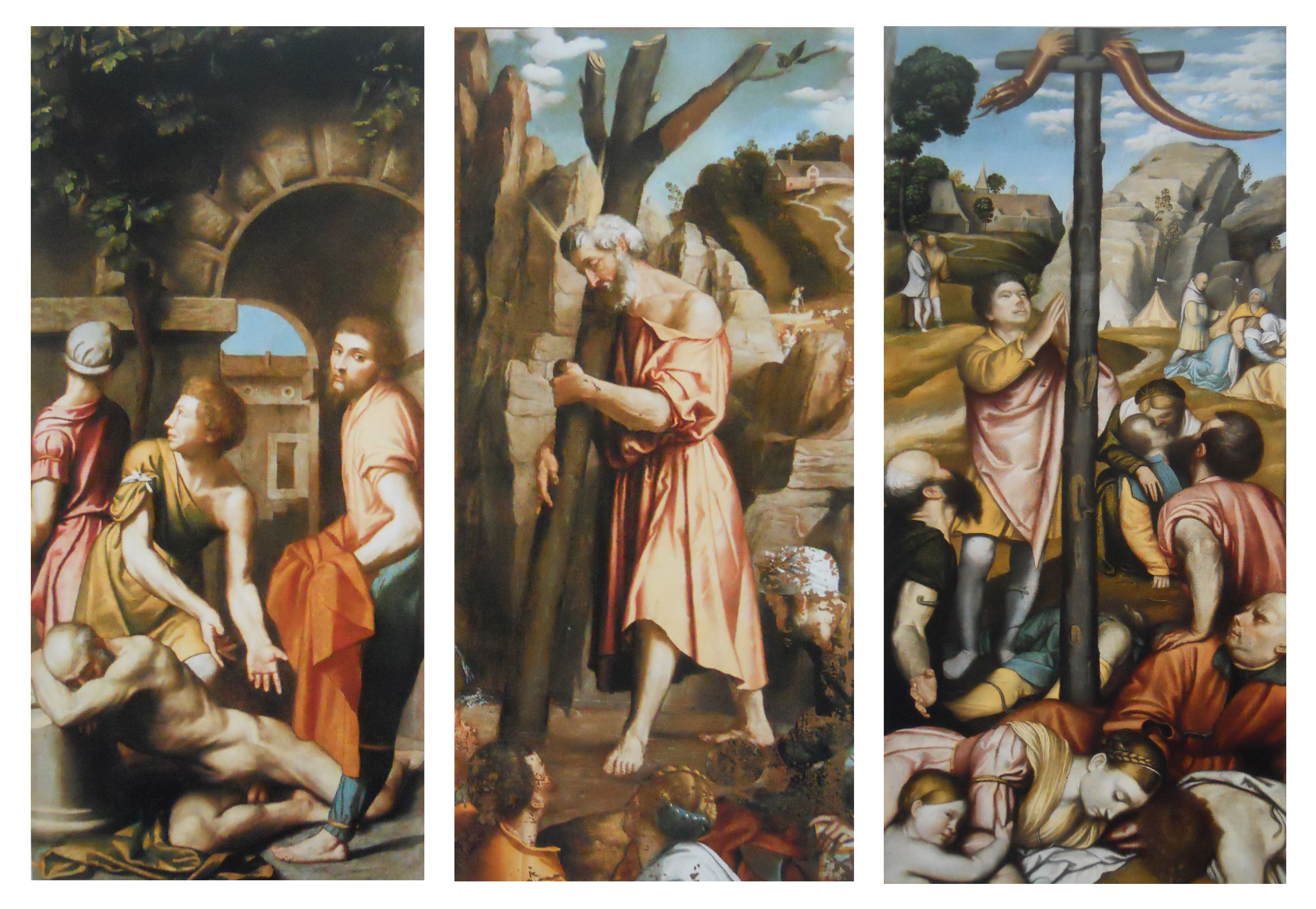
Salvation Triptych (1520s) by Moretto da Brescia

The Salvation Triptych (Italian: Trittico della Salvezza or Trittico della Salvazione) is a triptych in oils on canvas by Moretto da Brescia, dating to 1521–1524 or 1527–28. All three of its panels are now in private collections, two in Brescia and one in Biella.

The work centres on the theme of salvation brought about by the Passion of Christ, with side panels of The Drunkenness of Noah (left) and The Brazen Serpent (right) and a centre panel of Moses Striking the Rock at Mara, though no historian or art historian recorded seeing the three panels together. An archive note from 1912 mentions The Brazen Serpent in the Oldofredi collection in Brescia before being acquired by its current private owner in 1983. In 1750 Giovanni Battista Carboni mentioned Noah and Moses as still being in Brescia in the Maffei-Fenaroli collection, where they were also mentioned by Federico Odorici in his 1853 guidebook and in an 1875 catalogue of the collection. Noah was then put up for auction in 1882 but did not sell and so entered the Mazzotti-Fenaroli collection in Rudiano, and then its current home in the Fenaroli collection in Biella, both times by inheritance. Moses was instead acquired by the Bettoni-Cazzago collection.

== Bibliography ==
- Redona, Pier Virgilio Begni (1988), Alessandro Bonvicino – Il Moretto da Brescia (in Italian), Brescia: Editrice La Scuola
