= Madonna and Child with an Angel (Moretto) =

Painting by Moretto da Brescia

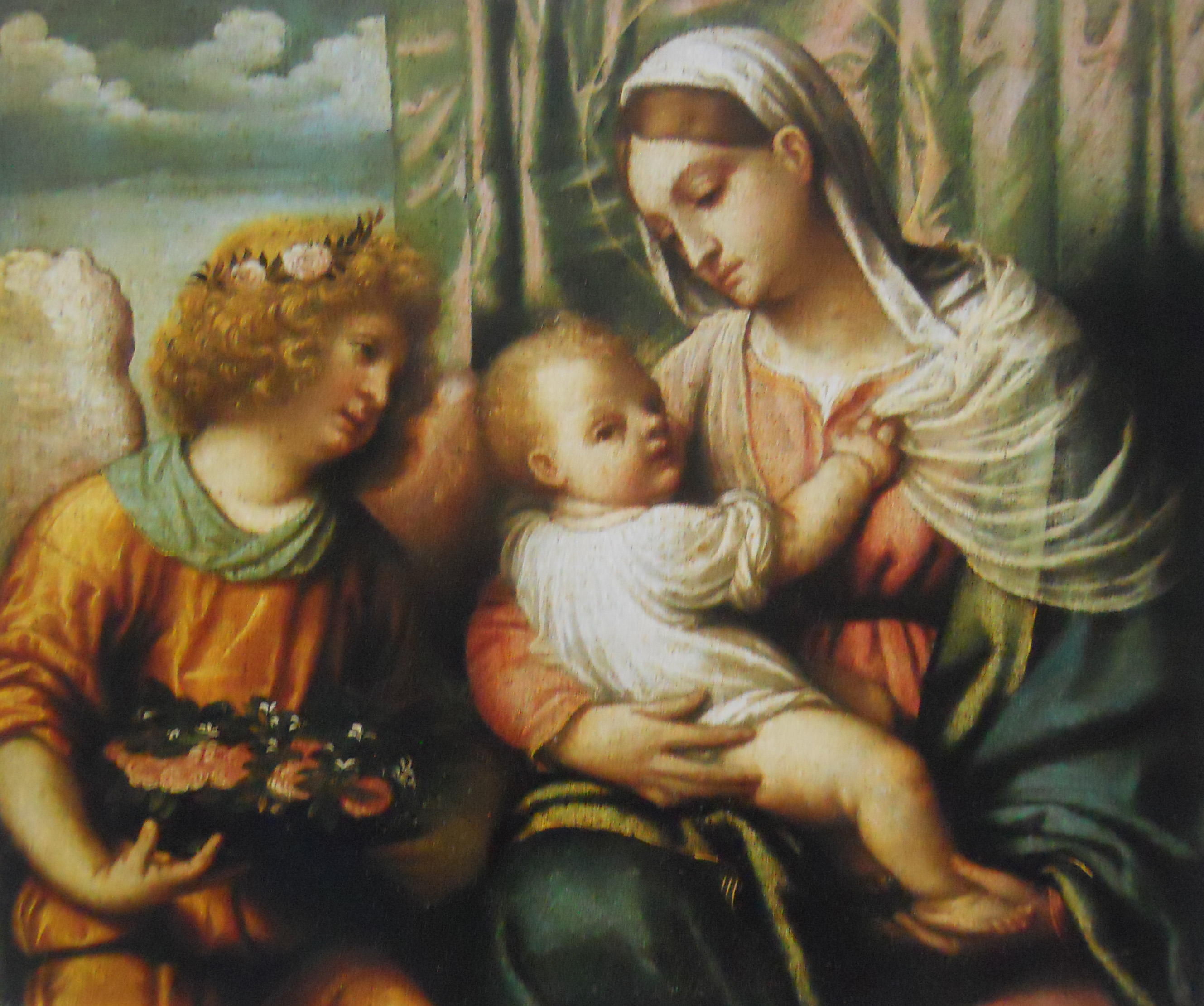
Madonna and Child with an Angel (c. 1540–1550) by Moretto da Brescia

Madonna and Child with an Angel is an oil on canvas painting by Moretto da Brescia, executed c. 1540–1550, now in the Pinacoteca di Brera in Milan, which acquired it in 1911. It had previously been in Gustavo Frizzoni's collection.
