= Chiesa di San Giovanni Evangelista Organ Case =

C.1535 painting by Moretto da Brescia

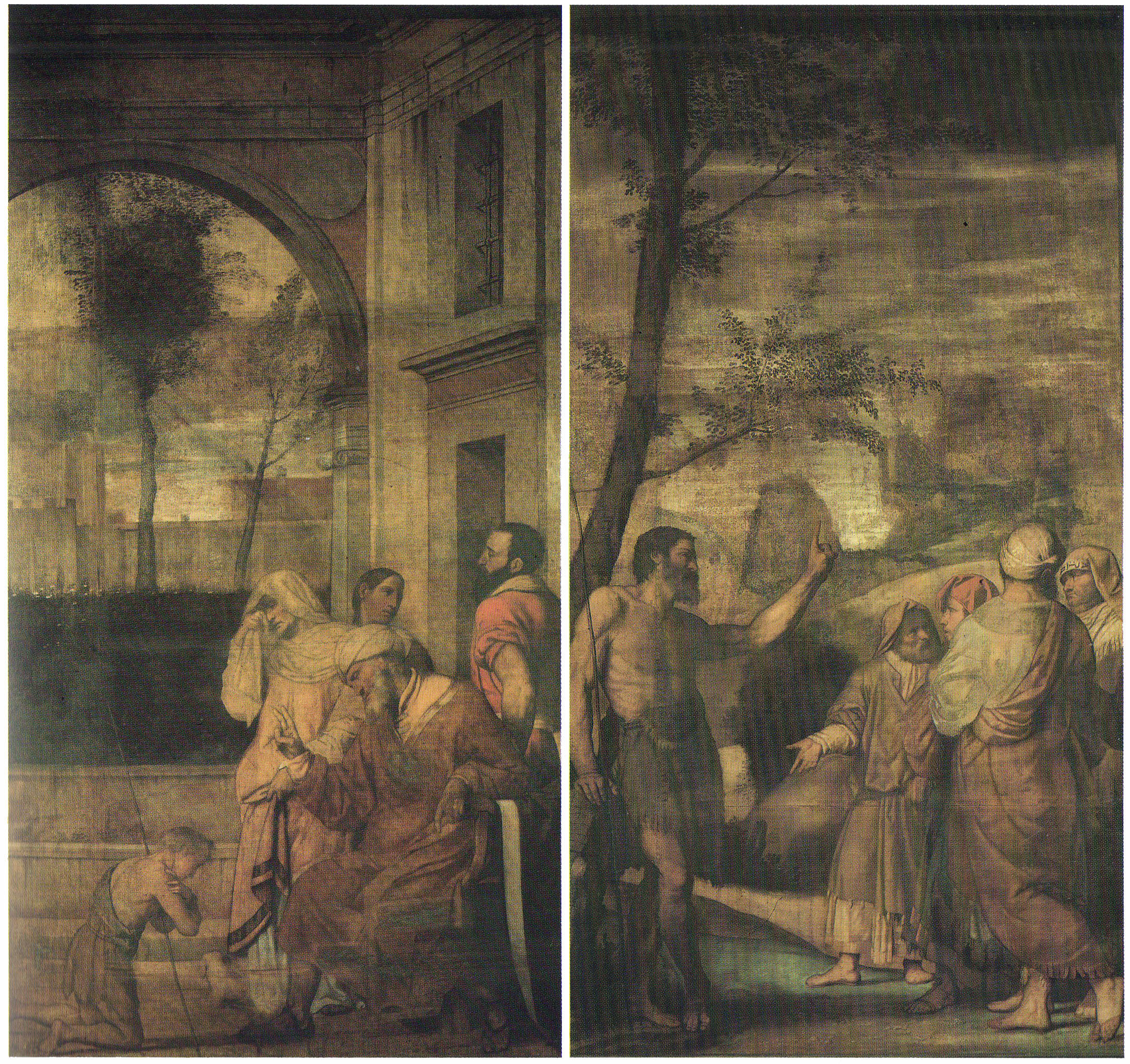
Chiesa di San Giovanni Evangelista Organ Case (c. 1535) by Moretto da Brescia

Chiesa di San Giovanni Evangelista Organ Case is a set of four tempera on canvas paintings produced by Moretto da Brescia, c. 1535. The inner sides show stories from the life of John the Baptist and scenes from the life of John the Evangelist. They now hang on the walls of the chancel of the church for which they were painted, San Giovanni Evangelista in Brescia.

The only source for their original site is Bernardino Faino in 1630 who mentions the doors "of the outside and of the inside in the hand of Moretto" At the end of the 17th century, Francesco Paglia describes them as removed from the organ and hanging on the walls of the chancel, from which he hypothesizes that the two saints John were originally the covers for the high altar, also by Moretto.
