= Portrait of an Ecclesiastic =

c. 1545 painting by Moretto da Brescia

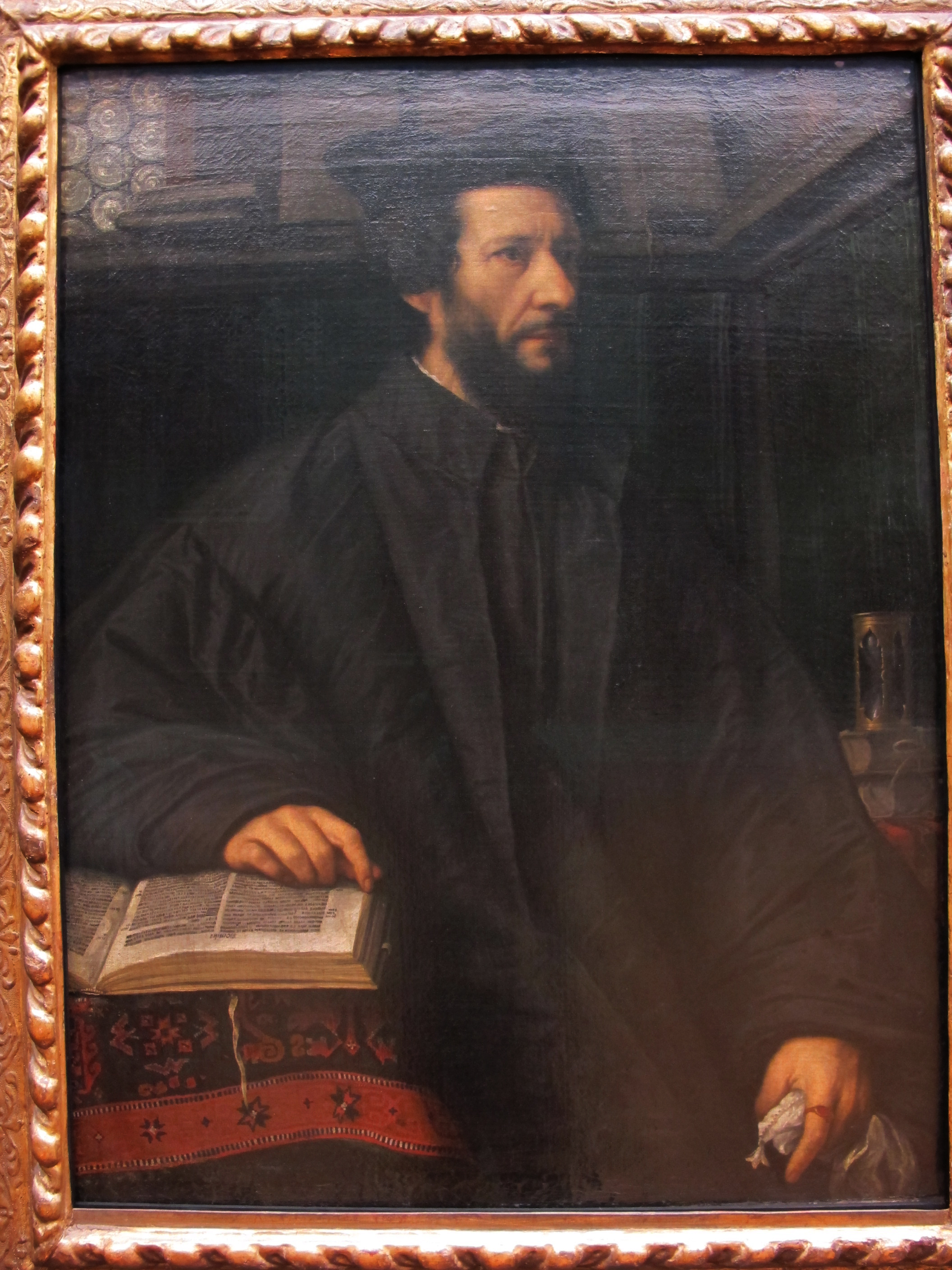
Portrait of an Ecclesiastic (c. 1545) by Moretto da Brescia

Portrait of an Ecclesiastic is an oil on canvas painting by Moretto da Brescia, executed c. 1545, now in the Alte Pinakothek in Munich, Germany. It was acquired in 1838 in Venice by marquess Canova.
