= Portrait of Fortunato Martinengo Cesaresco =

1542 painting by Moretto da Brescia

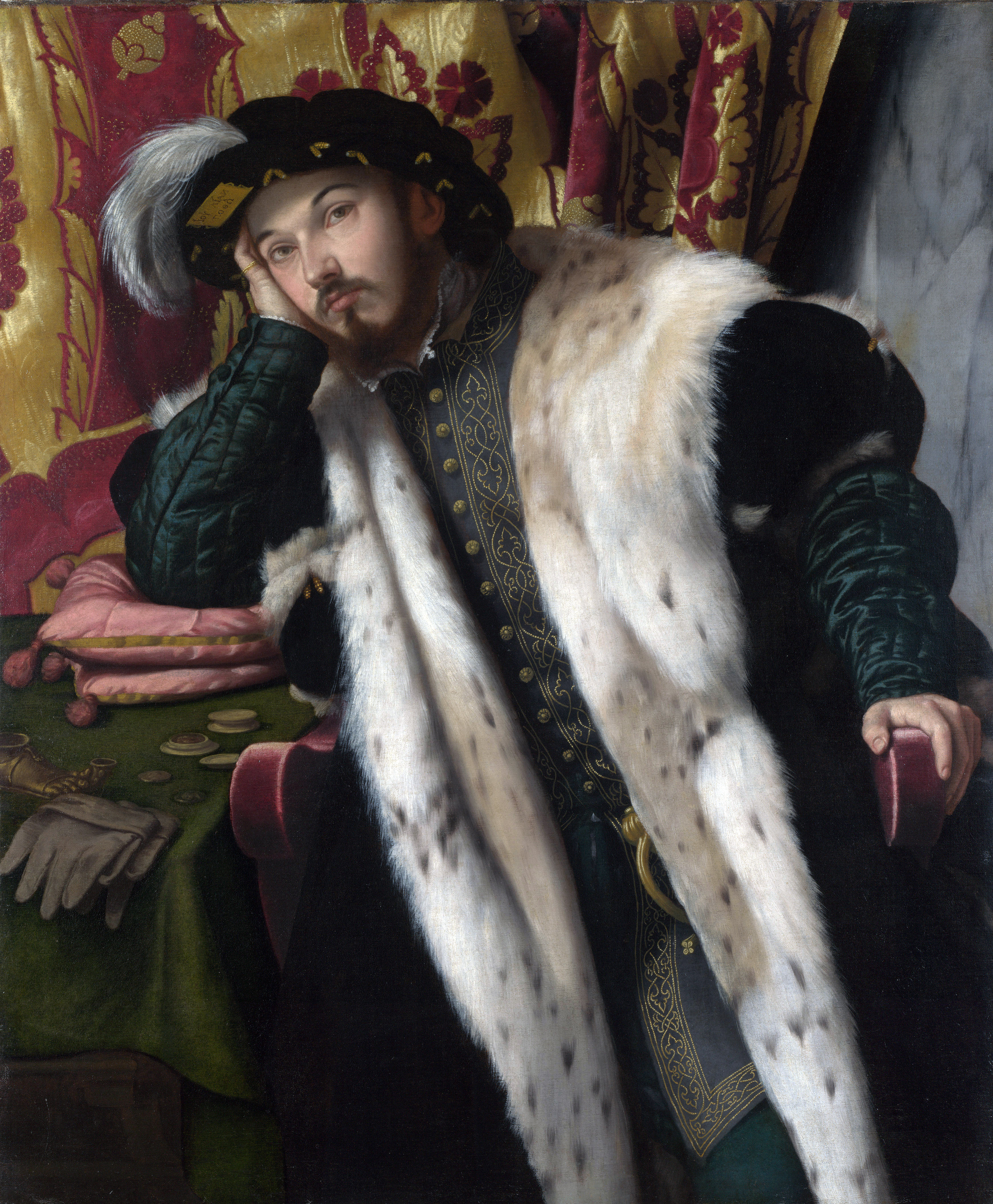
Portrait of Fortunato Martinengo Cesaresco (1542) by Moretto da Brescia

Portrait of Fortunato Martinengo Cesaresco is a 1542 oil on canvas painting by Moretto da Brescia, now in the National Gallery, London. The use of X-ray photography during a 1973 restoration showed a table in front of the man with an open book on it.

== History ==
The earliest mention of the work is in a mid 19th-century inventory of count Teodoro Lechi's collection - the family archives add that he acquired the work in Brescia on 19 September 1843 and on 9 January 1854 sold it on to Charles Henfrey of Turin, where Lechi was exiled from 1849 to 1859. In 1975 Cecil Gould cited documents in the National Gallery stating that in 1843 countess Marzia Martinengo Cesaresco had sold the painting to Lechi, who had married her daughter Clara. It passed from Henfry to Otto Mündler in 1856 and two years later was acquired by its present owner.

== Bibliography ==
- (in Italian) Camillo Boselli, Il Moretto, 1498-1554, in "Commentari dell'Ateneo di Brescia per l'anno 1954 – Supplemento", Brescia 1954
- Joseph Archer Crowe, Giovanni Battista Cavalcaselle, A history of painting in North Italy, London 1871
- (in Italian) Pietro Da Ponte, L'opera del Moretto, Brescia 1898
- William Dickes, A greek motto misread at the National Gallery, in "Athenaeum", n.3423, 3 June 1893
- György Gombosi, Moretto da Brescia, Basel 1943
- Cecil Gould, The sixteenth-century italian schools, London 1975
- (in Italian) Pompeo Molmenti, Il Moretto da Brescia, Firenze 1898
- (in Italian) Pier Virgilio Begni Redona, Alessandro Bonvicino – Il Moretto da Brescia, Editrice La Scuola, Brescia 1988
- (in Italian) Ottavio Rossi, Elogi historici di bresciani illustri, Brescia 1620
- (in Italian) Adolfo Venturi, Storia dell'arte italiana, volume IX, La pittura del Cinquecento, Milano 1929
