= Holy Cross Standard =

Painting by Moretto da Brescia

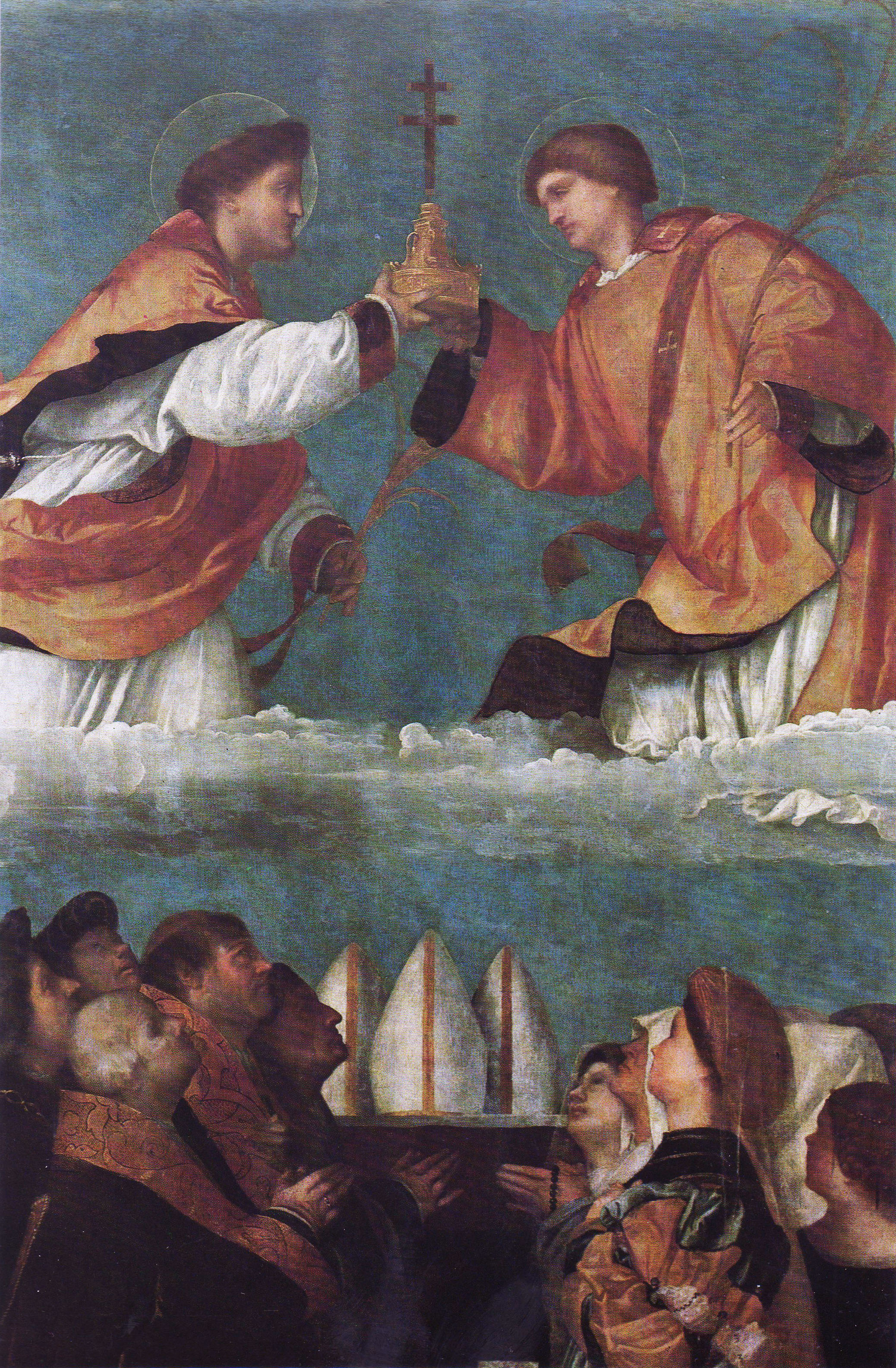
Holy Cross Standard (1520–1521) by Moretto da Brescia

The Holy Cross Standard is a 1520-1521 oil on canvas painting by Moretto da Brescia, commissioned by the Brescia's city council for the Company of the Guardians of the Holy Cross, guardians of the Sante Croci treasury at the city's Old Cathedral. It is now in the Pinacoteca Tosio Martinengo in the city.

== History ==
The city council decided on the commission on 3 March 1520.

== Bibliography (in Italy) ==
- Paolo Brognoli, Nuova Guida di Brescia, Brescia 1826
- Bernardino Faino, Catalogo Delle Chiese riuerite in Brescia, et delle Pitture et Scolture memorabili, che si uedono in esse in questi tempi, Brescia 1630
- Valerio Guazzoni, Bergamo per Lorenzo Lotto, conference papers and exhibition catalogue, Bergamo 1980
- Francesco Paglia, Il Giardino della Pittura, Brescia 1660
- Pier Virgilio Begni Redona, Alessandro Bonvicino - Il Moretto da Brescia, Editrice La Scuola, Brescia 1988
