= The Dead Christ Adored by Saint Jerome and Saint Dorothy =

C. 1520 painting by Moretto da Brescia

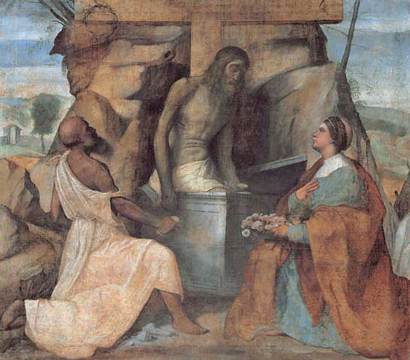
The Dead Christ Adored by Saint Jerome and Saint Dorothy (1520-1521) by Moretto da Brescia

The Dead Christ Adored by Saint Jerome and Saint Dorothy or Saint Jerome and Saint Dorothy Adoring Christ in the Tomb is a 1520-1521 tempera verniciata on canvas painting by Moretto da Brescia. It is on show above the left-hand side door to the church of Santa Maria in Calchera in Brescia, though it is not thought to have originally been produced for that church as neither Jerome nor Dorothy had an active cult in that parish and they rarely appear in art together.

Though no documents survive to back the hypothesis, it is highly probable that it was originally produced as a small altarpiece for the oratory of the Confraternity of Divine Love, which was active in the city in the 16th century and in which Moretto had several friends. This Confraternity was linked to St Jerome and St Dorothy - its original core was formed at Santa Dorotea church in Rome and its prior was elected on St Jerome's feast day. The date of its move to its present location is unknown, though it must have occurred by 1630, when Bernardino Faino saw it there and mentioned it in his guidebook to the city.

== Bibliography (in Italian) ==
- Gustavo Frizzoni, Alessandro Bonvicino, detto il Moretto pittore bresciano e le fonti storiche riferentesi, in "Giornale di erudizione artistica", Brescia, giugno 1875
- Fausto Lechi, Gaetano Panazza, La pittura bresciana del Rinascimento, exhibition catalogue, Bergamo 1939
- Pier Virgilio Begni Redona, Alessandro Bonvicino - Il Moretto da Brescia, Editrice La Scuola, Brescia 1988
- Adolfo Venturi, Storia dell'arte italiana, volume IX, La pittura del Cinquecento, Milano 1929
