= Annunciation (Moretto) =

Painting by Moretto da Brescia

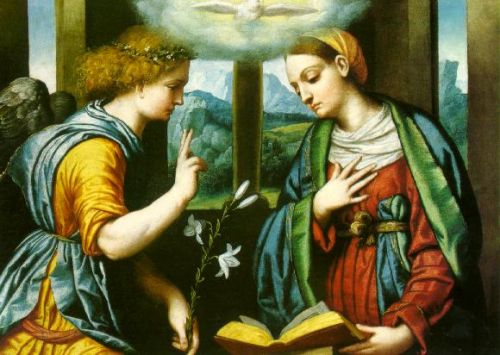
Annunciation (1535-1540) by Moretto da Brescia

Annunciation is a 1535–1540 oil on panel painting by Moretto da Brescia, now in the Pinacoteca Tosio Martinengo in Brescia, having been left to the city collection by count Paolo Tosio in 1832 – no previous owners are known. Its small dimensions mean it was probably painted for a home or clergy house rather than a church. Several replicas and copies are known, some of which are now lost.

Art historians adjudge it one of the artist's best works, "unique in the small oeuvre of Il Moretto" for its composition, colours and religious sense, all based on silvery and subdued tones. It is well-preserved – its first analysis in 1871 by Joseph Archer Crowe and Giovanni Battista Cavalcaselle called it a "fine and gracious painting and, even rarer, all in a good state of conservation". Pietro Da Ponte reinforced this in 1898, calling it a "small but very gracious and quite well-conserved work".

== Style ==
The first critical analysis of the work was by Pietro Da Ponte in 1898 – in the landscape background, which can be glimpsed through the room's windows and in the figures the silvery tints so characteristic of Moretto predominate and the composition breathes an air of youthful candour". In the article written by Fausto Lechi and Gaetano Panazza for the 1939 exhibition La Pittura bresciana del Rinascimento, they write that it "is a most gracious, small composition that blends the bright and warm colours and silvery tones which make it very precious. The two most sweet images live in an almost-dreamlike atmosphere made of silvery tones and blue-green lights like seawater".

In 1958 Gaetano Panazza called the work "a most delicious little panel, despite some heaviness in the cloud surrounds the Holy Spirit. It is one of Moretto's most successful creations, intimately poetic and rich in serene religiosity, silvery and cold in tones tuned and subdued, in which dark pearl predominates. The solution of the double-mullioned window is Lombard, perhaps with some Leonardesque sense, that lets us see the blue landscape in the background".

In 1974 Camillo Boselli wrote "the Annunciation is a delightful jewel, unique in Morretto's small oeuvre, of which several more or less autograph Madonnas are scattered in public or private collections are the most common examples. These works are not always securely identified as autograph works by Moretto since many of them are probably studio works.... [The Annunciation] is securely an autograph work due to the preciousness of the colours, for the scene's collected and serene religious sense. The splendid landscape with that luminous meadow level is admirable [...]".
