= Mystic Marriage of Saint Catherine (Moretto) =

Painting by Moretto da Brescia

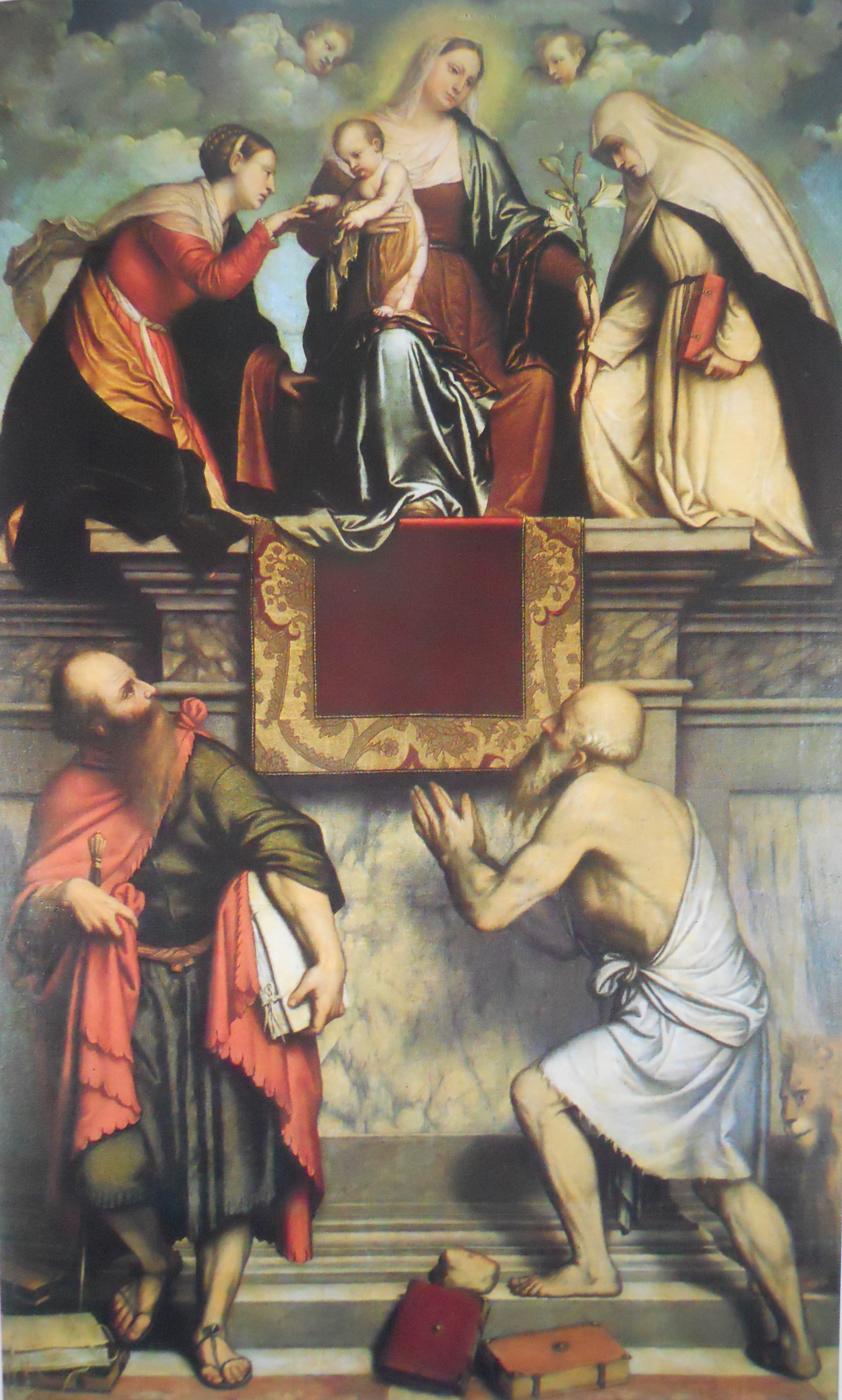
Mystic Marriage of Saint Catherine (c. 1543) by Moretto da Brescia

Mystic Marriage of Saint Catherine is an oil on canvas painting by Moretto da Brescia, executed c. 1543, on display on a side altar in the Church of San Clemente in Brescia. In the upper register are Catherine of Alexandria, the Madonna and Child and Catherine of Siena, whilst below are Paul and Jerome.
