= Rovelli Altarpiece =

1539 painting by Moretto da Brescia

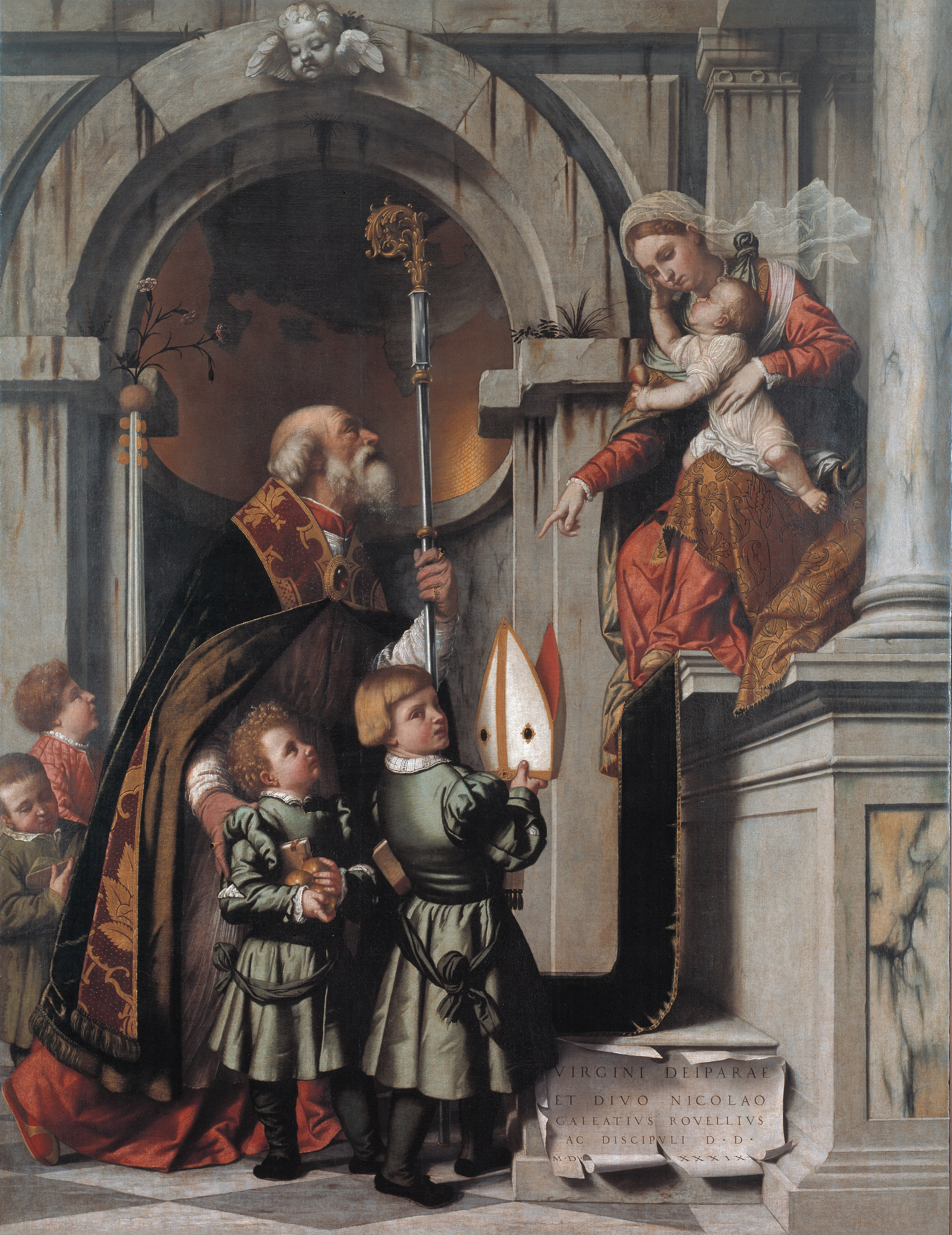
Rovelli Altarpiece (1539) by Moretto da Brescia

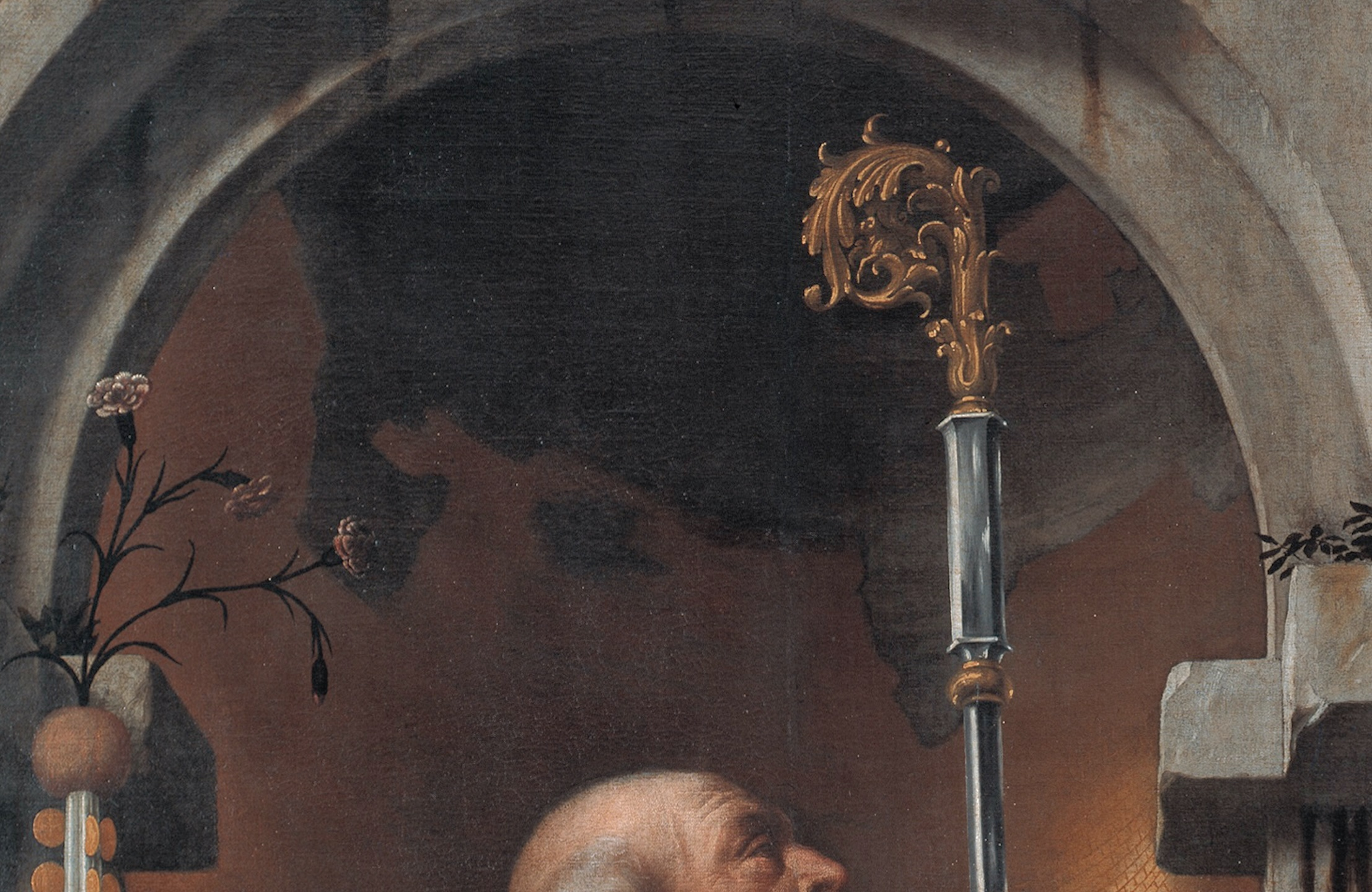
detail of Rovelli Altarpiece showing the map of the Indian Ocean

The Rovelli Altarpiece is a 1539 oil on canvas painting by Moretto da Brescia, which since 1899 has been in the Pinacoteca Tosio Martinengo in Brescia, Italy. Strongly influenced by Titian, it is named after the schoolmaster Galeazzo Rovelli who commissioned it for the church of Santa Maria dei Miracoli in Brescia in 1539, where it remained until being removed in the 19th century and replaced by a copy. Its composition was reused by Moroni in his Mystic Marriage of Saint Catherine in the 1560s.

It shows Nicholas of Bari presenting two of Rovelli's pupils to the Madonna and Child, with two more behind the saint. One of the pupils in the foreground holds a mitre while the other holds a book and three gold balls, traditional attributes of St Nicholas. The painting contains an image of the Indian Ocean littoral, hidden in the crumbling golden mosaics of the semi-dome behind the figures.

== Bibliography (in Italian) ==
- Giulio Antonio Averoldi, Le scelte pitture di Brescia additate al forestiere, Brescia 1700
- Camillo Boselli, Il Moretto, 1498-1554, in "Commentari dell'Ateneo di Brescia per l'anno 1954 - Supplemento", Brescia 1954
- Bernardino Faino, Catalogo Delle Chiese riuerite in Brescia, et delle Pitture et Scolture memorabili, che si uedono in esse in questi tempi, Brescia 1630
- Stefano Fenaroli, Alessandro Bonvicino soprannominato il Moretto pittore bresciano. Memoria letta all'Ateneo di Brescia il giorno 27 luglio 1873, Brescia 1875
- Gustavo Frizzoni, Alessandro Bonvicino, detto il Moretto pittore bresciano e le fonti storiche riferentesi, in "Giornale di erudizione artistica", Brescia, giugno 1875
- Max Jordan, Geschichte der Italienichen Malerei, Lipsia 1876
- Francesco Paglia, Il Giardino della Pittura, Brescia 1630
- Gaetano Panazza, I Civici Musei e la Pinacoteca di Brescia, Bergamo 1958
- György Gombosi, Moretto da Brescia, Basel 1943
- Federico Odorici, Storie Bresciane dai primi tempi sino all'età nostra, Brescia 1853
- Francesco Paglia, Il Giardino della Pittura, Brescia 1675
- Pier Virgilio Begni Redona, Alessandro Bonvicino – Il Moretto da Brescia, Editrice La Scuola, Brescia 1988
- Carlo Ridolfi, Le maraviglie dell'arte Ouero le vite de gl'illvstri pittori veneti, e dello stato. Oue sono raccolte le Opere insigni, i costumi, & i ritratti loro. Con la narratione delle Historie, delle Fauole, e delle Moralità da quelli dipinte, Brescia 1648
- Adolfo Venturi, Storia dell'arte italiana, volume IX, La pittura del Cinquecento, Milano 1929
