= Luzzatto =

Luzzatto (or Luzzato) is an Italian surname. According to a tradition communicated by S. D. Luzzatto, the family descends from a German Jew who immigrated into Italy from the province of Lusatia, and who was named after his native place.

Notable people with the surname include:

- Amos Luzzatto (1928–2020), Italian Jewish writer
- Carolina Luzzatto (1837–1919), Italian journalist and writer
- Filosseno Luzzatto (1829–1854), Italian Jewish scholar, son of Samuel David Luzzatto
- Laura Luzzatto Dallapiccola, known as Laura Dallapiccola (1911–1995), Italian librarian and translator
- Moshe Chaim Luzzatto (1707–1746), Italian rabbi, kabbalist, and philosopher
- Samuel David Luzzatto (1800–1865), Italian Jewish scholar, and poet
- Simone Luzzatto (1583–1663), Italian rabbi

== See also ==
- Emanuele Luzzati
- Luigi Luzzatti
- Fiorello La Guardia, born to Irene Luzzatto-Coen
- Luzzago
