= Portrait of a Gentleman with a Letter =

C. 1540 painting by Moretto da Brescia

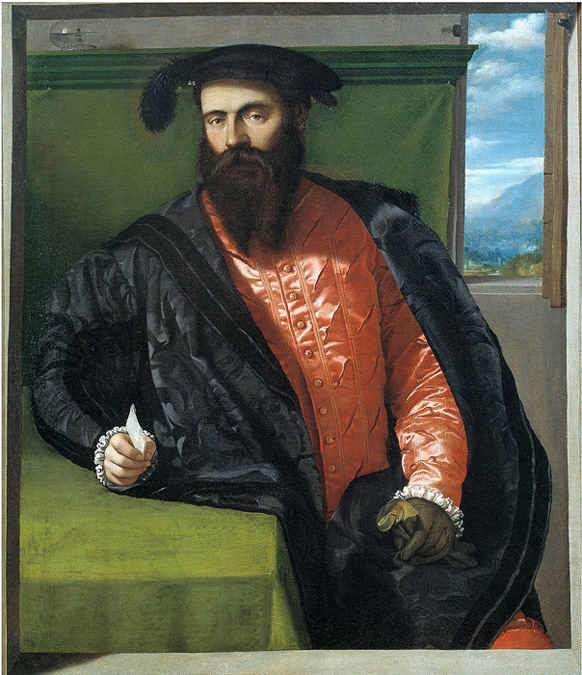
Portrait of a Gentleman with a Letter (1535-1540) by Moretto da Brescia

Portrait of a Gentleman with a Letter is a 1535–1540 painting by Moretto da Brescia, now in the Pinacoteca Tosio Martinengo in Brescia, to which it was given in 1854. No record of it before that dates survives, though some art historians have identified it with a lost Portrait of Pietro Aretino recorded in correspondence.

== Bibliography (in Italian) ==
- Camillo Boselli, Il Moretto, 1498-1554, in "Commentari dell'Ateneo di Brescia per l'anno 1954 - Supplemento", Brescia 1954
- Pietro Da Ponte, L'opera del Moretto, Brescia 1898
- Ugo Fleres, La pinacoteca dell'Ateneo in Brescia in "Le gallerie nazionali italiane", anno 4, 1899
- Gustavo Frizzoni, La Pinacoteca comunale Martinengo in Brescia in "Archivio storico dell'arte", Brescia 1889
- Giovanni Morelli, Kunstkritische Studien über italienische Malerei - Die Galerien Borghese und Doria Panfili in Rom, Leipzig 1890
- Giorgio Nicodemi, La pinacoteca Tosio e Martinengo, Bologna 1927
- Gaetano Panazza, I Civici Musei e la Pinacoteca di Brescia, Bergamo 1958
- Gaetano Panazza, La Pinacoteca e i Musei di Brescia, nuova edizione, Bergamo 1968
- Pier Virgilio Begni Redona, Alessandro Bonvicino – Il Moretto da Brescia, Editrice La Scuola, Brescia 1988
- Adolfo Venturi, Storia dell'arte italiana, volume IX, La pittura del Cinquecento, Milano 1929
