= Christ with the Cross =

1518 painting by Moretto da Brescia

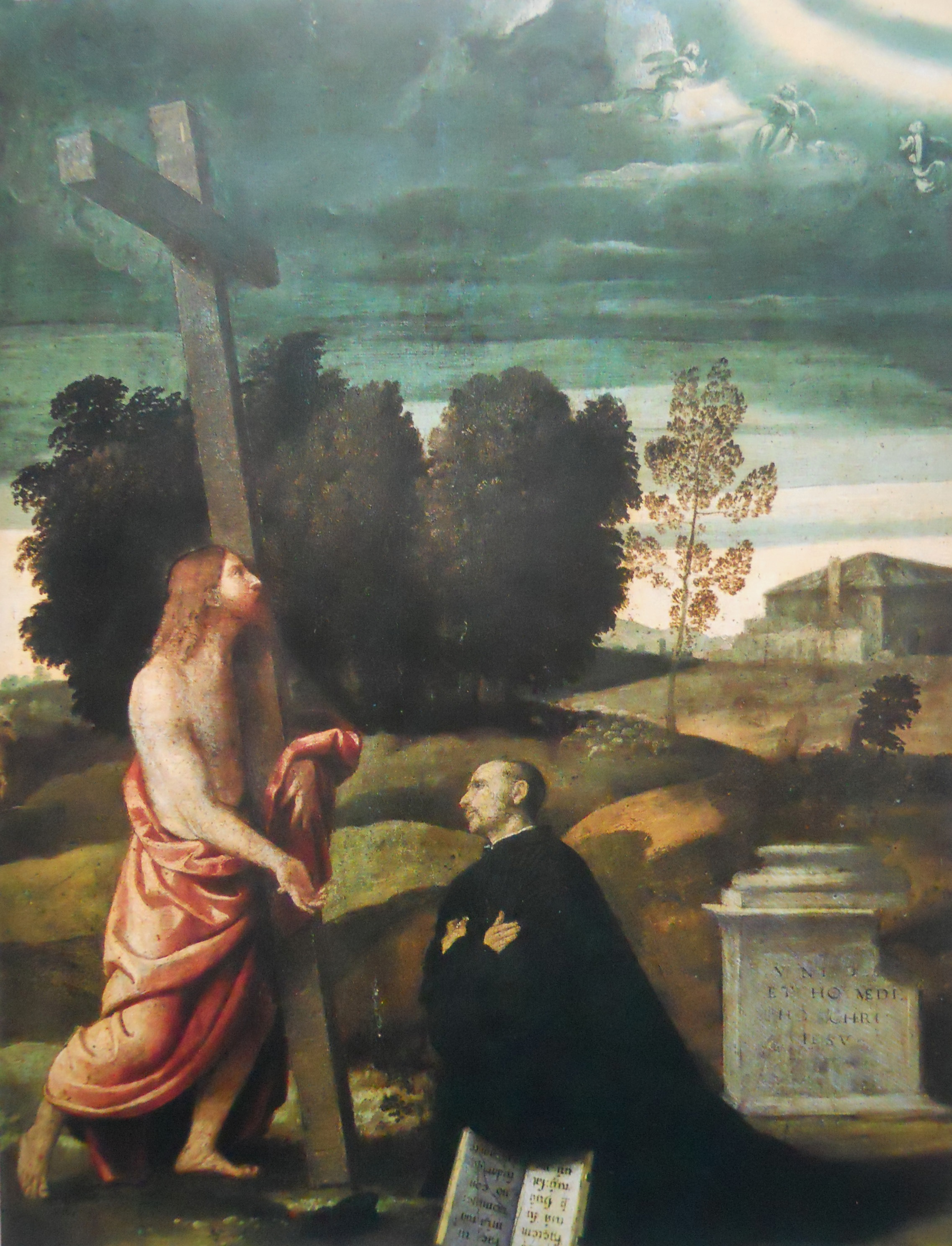
Christ with a Cross (1518) by Moretto da Brescia

Christ with the Cross or Christ with the Cross and a Monk is a 1518 oil on panel painting by Moretto da Brescia, now in the Accademia Carrara in Bergamo.

It is first recorded in 1859, when it was in the collection of Gugliemo Lochis, an inhabitant of Brescia, where it was misattributed to Titian - no previous owners are known. The first study of the work came in 1886 restored the correct attribution and dated it to Moretto's youth.
