= Massacre of the Innocents (Moretto) =

Painting by Moretto da Brescia

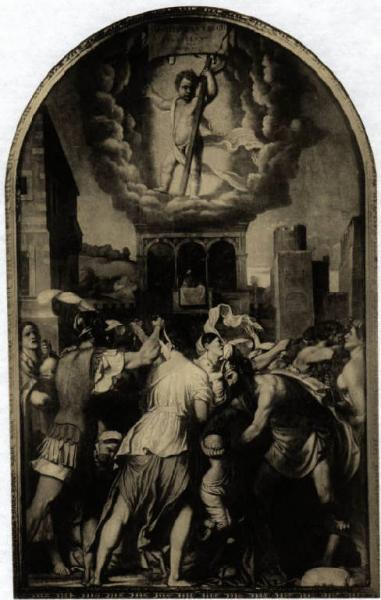
Massacre of the Innocents (1531-1532) by Moretto da Brescia

Massacre of the Innocents is an altarpiece oil painting by Moretto da Brescia, executed in 1531–1532, originally painted on panel but later transferred to canvas. It is on display on a side altar in San Giovanni Evangelista church in Brescia.

It was commissioned by Innocenzo Casari and his brother Giovanni Casari in compliance with the will of Giovanni Innocenzo Casari (died 19 September 1530), a third brother's son, which stipulated the erection of an altar dedicated to the Holy Innocents in the church of San Giovanni Evangelista. Innocenzo was superior general of a monastery of Lateran Canons attached to that church and Giovanni its prior.

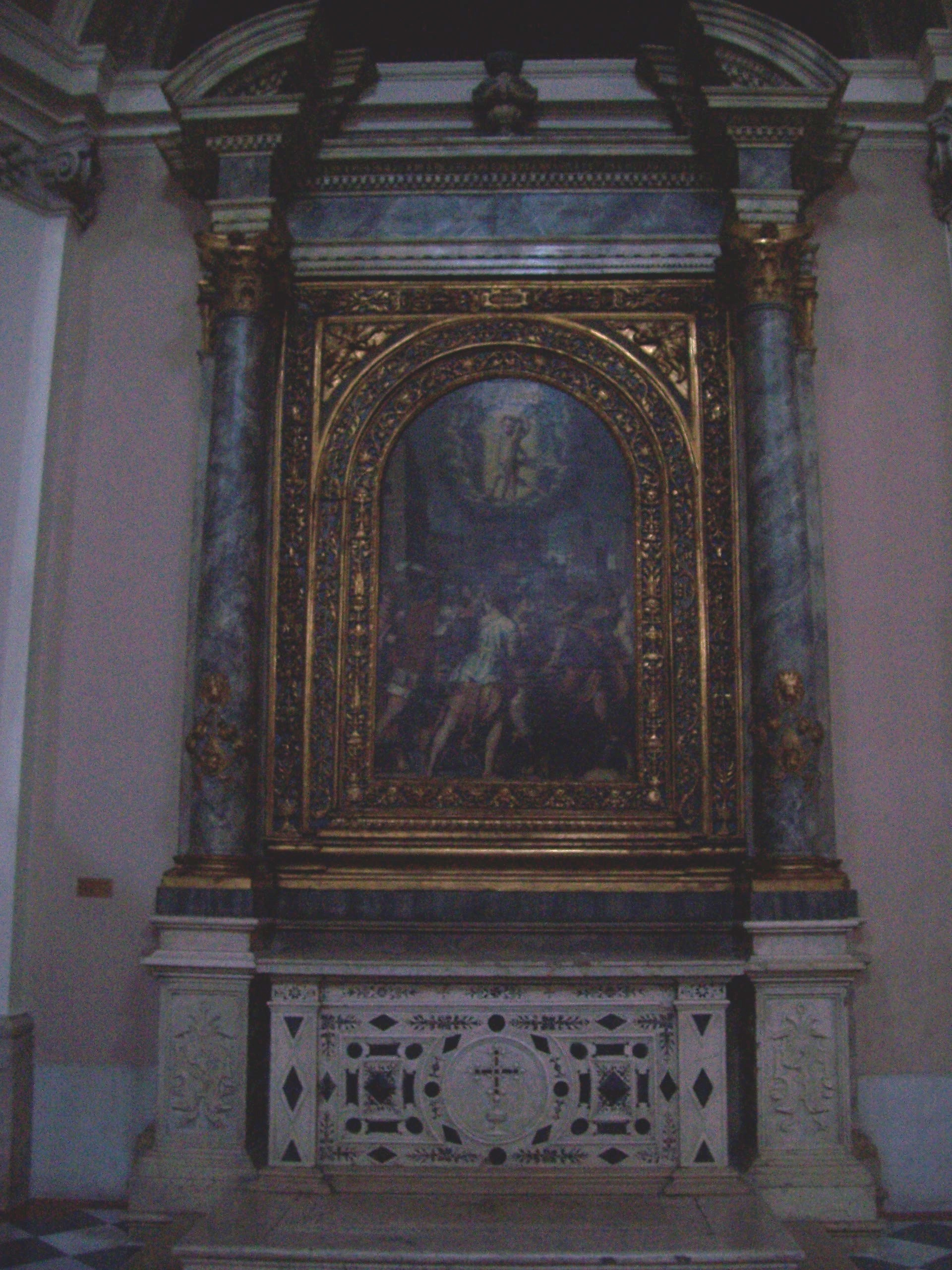
The altarpiece in its setting

== Bibliography (in Italian) ==
- Giulio Antonio Averoldi, Le scelte pitture di Brescia additate al forestiere, Brescia 1700
- Camillo Boselli, Il Moretto, 1498-1554, in "Commentari dell'Ateneo di Brescia per l'anno 1954 - Supplemento", Brescia 1954
- Joseph Archer Crowe, Giovanni Battista Cavalcaselle, A history of painting in North Italy, Londra 1871
- Bernardino Faino, Catalogo Delle Chiese riuerite in Brescia, et delle Pitture et Scolture memorabili, che si uedono in esse in questi tempi, Brescia 1630
- Paolo Guerrini, L'altare dei Santi Innocenti in San Giovanni e la famiglia Casari in "L'illustrazione bresciana", 1º gennaio 1907
- Sandro Guerrini, Note e documenti per la storia dell'arte bresciana dal XVI al XVIII secolo. Prima parte. Per Stefano Lamberti, il Moretto, e per la storia del monastero di San Giovanni di Brescia, Brixia Sacra, gennaio-agosto 1986
- Roberto Longhi, Cose bresciane del Cinquecento, in "L'arte", anno 20, Brescia 1917
- Pompeo Molmenti, La scuola veneta e il Moretto in "Commentari dell'Ateneo di Brescia per l'anno 1891", Brescia 1891
- Antonio Morassi, Catalogo delle cose d'arte e di antichità d'Italia - Brescia, Roma 1939
- Giorgio Nicodemi, Per un libro sul Romanino, in "L'arte", anno 29, Brescia 1926
- Federico Odorici, Storie Bresciane dai primi tempi sino all'età nostra, Brescia 1853
- Kurt Rathe, "Il Moretto e l'arte grafica", in Maso Finiguerra, 6º (1941), fasc. 1–3.
- Pier Virgilio Begni Redona, Alessandro Bonvicino – Il Moretto da Brescia, Editrice La Scuola, Brescia 1988
- Alessandro Sala, Collezione de' quadri scelti di Brescia disegnati incisi ed illustrati da Alessandro Sala, Brescia, Franzoni, 1817.
