= Assumption of the Virgin (Moretto) =

c. 1526 painting by Moretto da Brescia

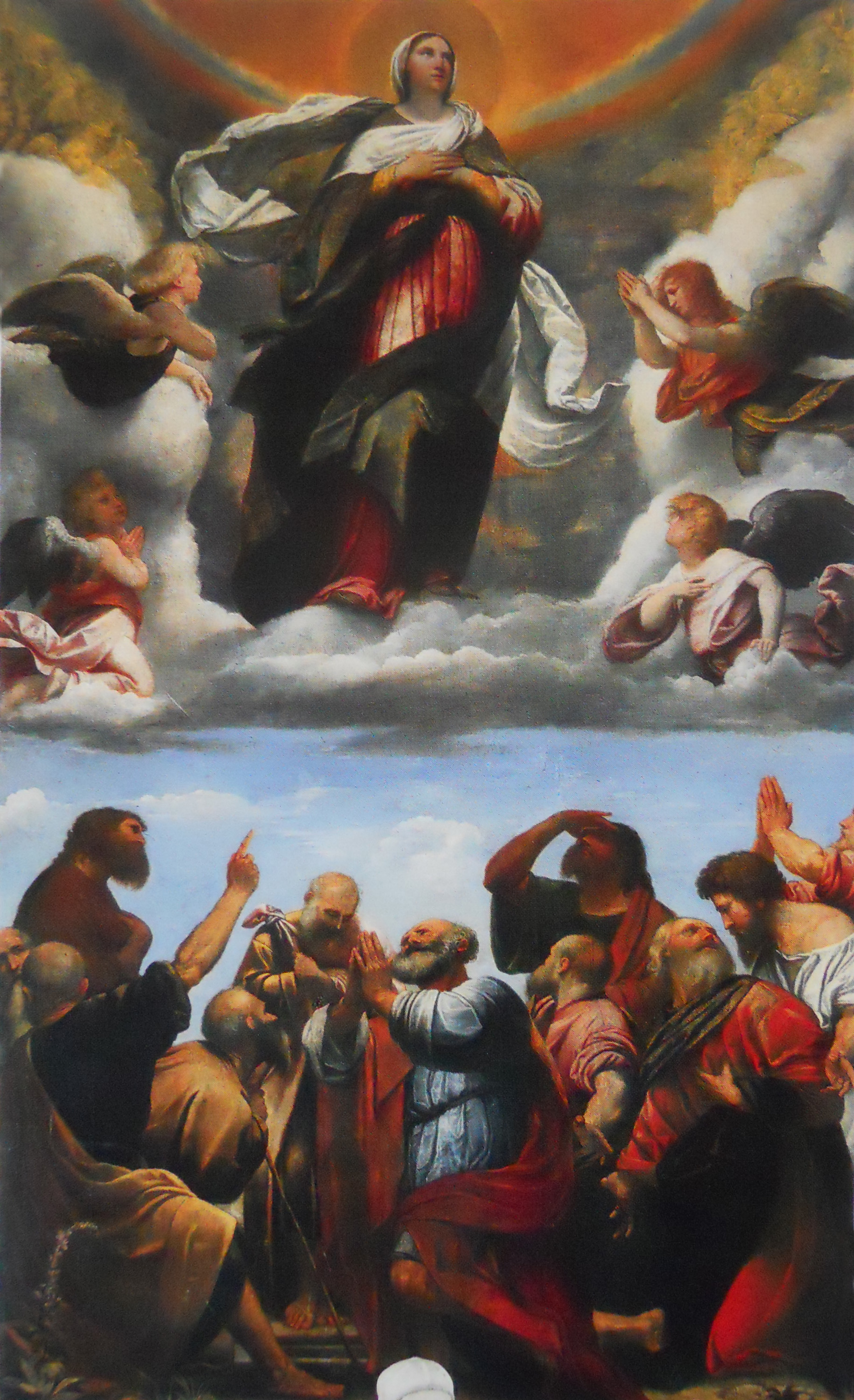
Assumption of the Virgin (1524–1526) by Moretto da Brescia

Assumption of the Virgin is a 1524–1526 oil on canvas painting by Moretto da Brescia, displayed as the high altarpiece in the Old Cathedral in Brescia.

Considered as the main masterpiece of the artist's youth, he was paid for it on 5 November 1526 according to the Liber bollettarum in the cathedral's archive.

== Bibliography (in Italian) ==
- Giulio Antonio Averoldi, Le scelte pitture di Brescia additate al forestiere, Brescia 1700
- Camillo Boselli, Appunti al "Catalogo delle opere d'arte nelle chiese di Brescia" in "Commentari dell'Ateneo di Brescia per gli anni 1942-1945", Brescia 1942-1945
- Camillo Boselli, Il Moretto, 1498-1554, in "Commentari dell'Ateneo di Brescia per l'anno 1954 - Supplemento", Brescia 1954
- Pietro Da Ponte, L'opera del Moretto, Brescia 1898
- György Gombosi, Moretto da Brescia, Basel 1943
- Pompeo Molmenti, Il Moretto da Brescia, Firenze 1898
- Francesco Paglia, Il Giardino della Pittura, Brescia 1660
- Gaetano Panazza, Camillo Boselli, Pitture in Brescia dal Duecento all'Ottocento, catalogo della mostra, Brescia 1946
- Pier Virgilio Begni Redona, Alessandro Bonvicino - Il Moretto da Brescia, Editrice La Scuola, Brescia 1988
