= The Deaf-Mute Filippo Viotti's Vision of the Virgin Mary =

Painting by Moretto da Brescia

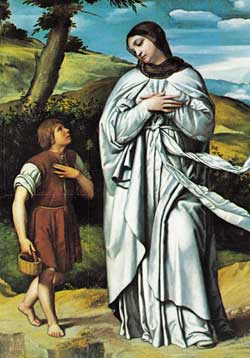
The Deaf-Mute Filippo Viotti's Vision of the Virgin Mary (c. 1534) by Moretto da Brescia

The Deaf-Mute Filippo Viotti's Vision of the Virgin Mary is an oil on canvas painting by Moretto da Brescia, executed c. 1534, displayed in the Santuario della Madonna at Paitone in the Province of Brescia, Italy. It is first recorded in 1648 by Carlo Ridolfi, who wrote that "in the church atop Monte Paitone one can still admire a miraculous image of the Virgin which Moretto made at the request of that town for such a miracle".

It shows Viotti's vision of the Virgin Mary in August 1532 and his resulting miraculous cure. It belongs to the artist's mature period but is separate from his style of that time due to its attempt to be as faithful a reproduction of the miracle as possible. It is marked by the Virgin's flowing robes, the very precise artistic rendering and the extremely concrete nature of the figures, where the sacred is totally translated into the real and no obviously miraculous elements are shown.

== Bibliography (in Italian) ==
- Michele Biancale, Giovanni Battista Moroni e i pittori bresciani in "L'arte", anno 17, Roma 1914
- Joseph Archer Crowe, Giovanni Battista Cavalcaselle, A history of painting in North Italy, Londra 1871
- Gustavo Frizzoni, Recensione dei pittori italiani - Le Gallerie di Monaco e Dresda in "Archivio storico dell'arte", anno 6, 1893
- Valerio Guazzoni, Moretto. Il tema sacro, Brescia 1981
- Giovanni Morelli, Le opere dei maestri italiani nelle Gallerie di Monaco, Dresda e Berlino, Bologna 1886
- Fausto Lechi, Gaetano Panazza, La pittura bresciana del Rinascimento, catalogo della mostra, Bergamo 1939
- Pier Virgilio Begni Redona, Alessandro Bonvicino - Il Moretto da Brescia, Editrice La Scuola, Brescia 1988
- Carlo Ridolfi, Le maraviglie dell'arte Ouero le vite de gl'illvstri pittori veneti, e dello stato. Oue sono raccolte le Opere insigni, i costumi, & i ritratti loro. Con la narratione delle Historie, delle Fauole, e delle Moralità da quelli dipinte, Brescia 1648
