= Christ in Glory with Saint Peter and Saint Paul =

c. 1540 painting by Moretto da Brescia

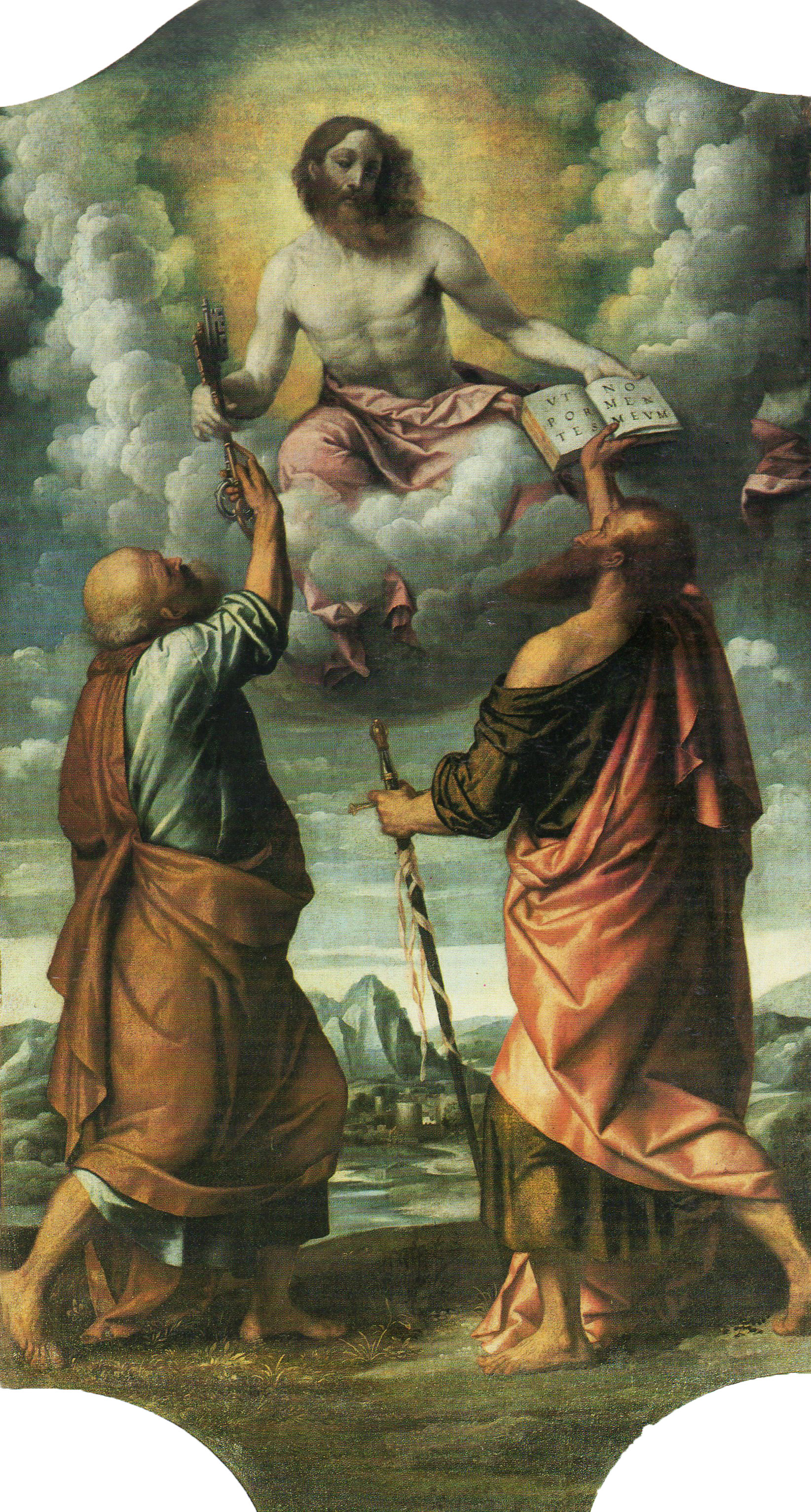
Christ in Glory with Saint Peter and Saint Paul (c. 1540) by Moretto da Brescia

Christ in Glory with Saint Peter and Saint Paul is an oil on canvas painting by Moretto da Brescia, executed c. 1540, displayed on the altar dedicated to St Peter in the abbey church of San Nicola in Rodengo-Saiano, where it has been since its production. It shows Christ handing the keys of the kingdom to Saint Peter and the book of doctrine to Paul of Tarsus. It was probably commissioned by one or more of the Olivetan monks of the church, probably by Tommaso da Gussago, as referred to by Luigi Fé d'Ostiani in 1886 on the basis of an unidentified document.

It remained on its original altar during the 18th century alterations to the church's interior, though a strip of canvas was added to the top and bottom of the work. Missed by 19th and early 20th century scholarship, the work has been more widely known since being shown in an exhibition of Brescian art in 1946 and restored in 1971.

== Bibliography (in Italian) ==
- Pietro Da Ponte, L'opera del Moretto, Brescia 1898
- Stefano Fenaroli, Alessandro Bonvicino soprannominato il Moretto pittore bresciano. Memoria letta all'Ateneo di Brescia il giorno 27 luglio 1873, Brescia 1875
- Stefano Fenaroli, Il monastero di Rodengo e le cose d'arte che ancora vi rimangono, in "Commentari dell'Ateneo di Brescia per l'anno 1878", Brescia 1878
- György Gombosi, Moretto da Brescia, Basel 1943
- Francesco Paglia, Il Giardino della Pittura, Brescia 1675
- Gaetano Panazza, Quadri dell'abbazia di Rodengo restaurati a cura del Rotary Club di Brescia, in "Bollettino del Rotary Club di Brescia", n. 5, Brescia 1971
- Gaetano Panazza, Camillo Boselli, Pitture in Brescia dal Duecento all'Ottocento, catalogo della mostra, Brescia 1946
