= Christ with Moses and Solomon =

C. 1542 painting by Moretto da Brescia

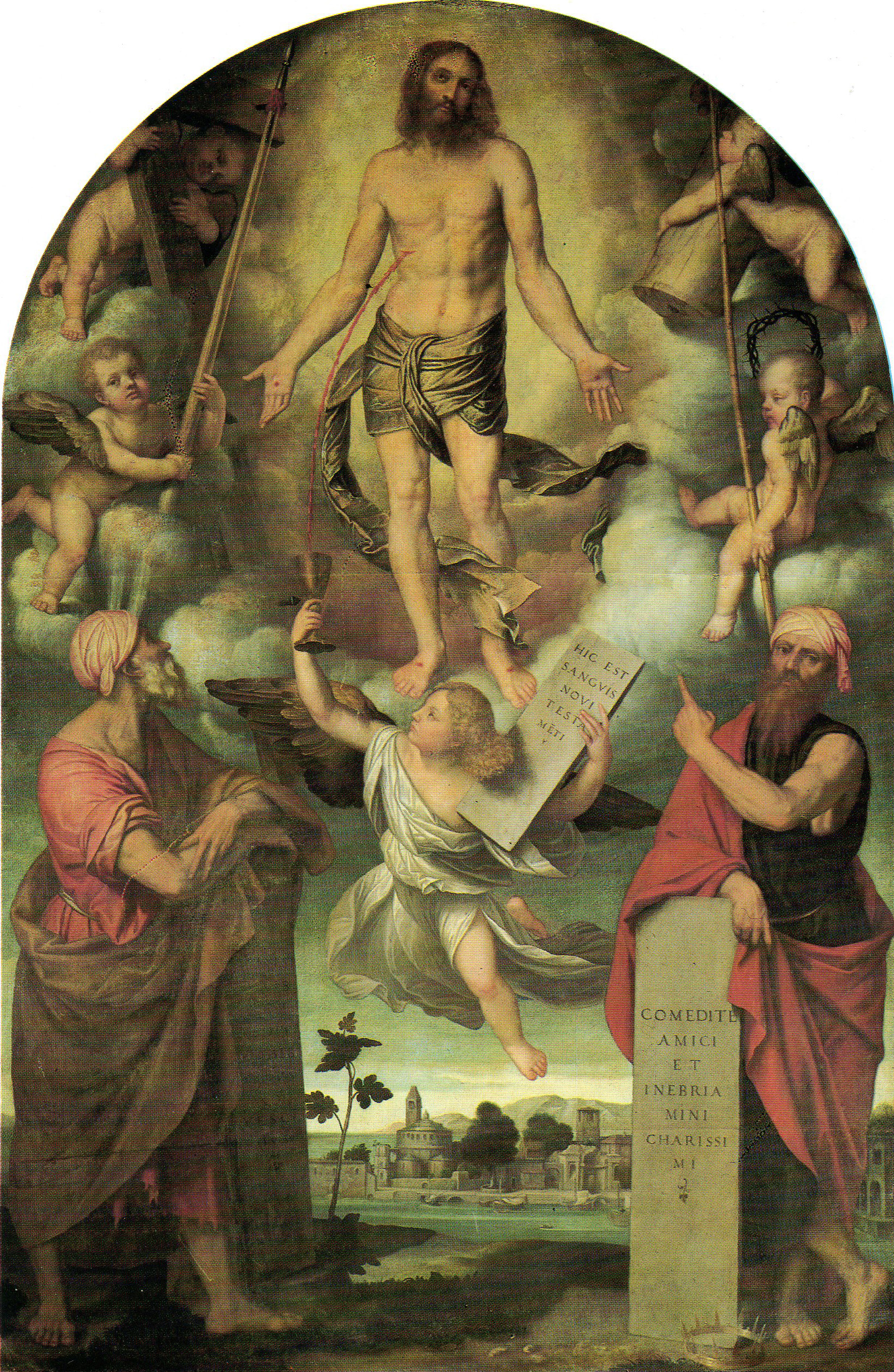
Christ with Moses and Solomon (1541–1542) by Moretto da Brescia

Christ with Moses and Solomon is a 1541–1542 oil on canvas painting by Moretto da Brescia, displayed on the altar of the Most Holy Sacrament in the collegiate church of Santi Nazaro e Celso in Brescia, the artist's home town. It has been the altarpiece for that altar throughout the historical record, from Bernardino Faino's mention of it in 1630 to the present day.

The parish archive contains 18th century documents referring to lost earlier documents, including a 1720 note mentioning a contract dated of 4 May 1541 in which took on "Alessandro Moretto ... to make the Altarpiece (for the [chapel of the] Most Holy Sacrament), and to complete it and put it in place the following year". A 1768 note also mentions this contract and states the painting was delivered on time in 1542.

== Bibliography (in Italian) ==
- Giulio Antonio Averoldi, Le scelte pitture di Brescia additate al forestiere, Brescia 1700
- Camillo Boselli, Il Moretto, 1498-1554, in "Commentari dell'Ateneo di Brescia per l'anno 1954 – Supplemento", Brescia 1954
- György Gombosi, Moretto da Brescia, Basel 1943
- Valerio Guazzoni, Moretto. Il tema sacro, Brescia 1981
- Federico Odorici, Storie Bresciane dai primi tempi sino all'età nostra, Brescia 1853
- Adolfo Venturi, Storia dell'arte italiana, volume IX, La pittura del Cinquecento, Milano 1929
