= Pentecost (Moretto) =

c. 1544 painting by Moretto

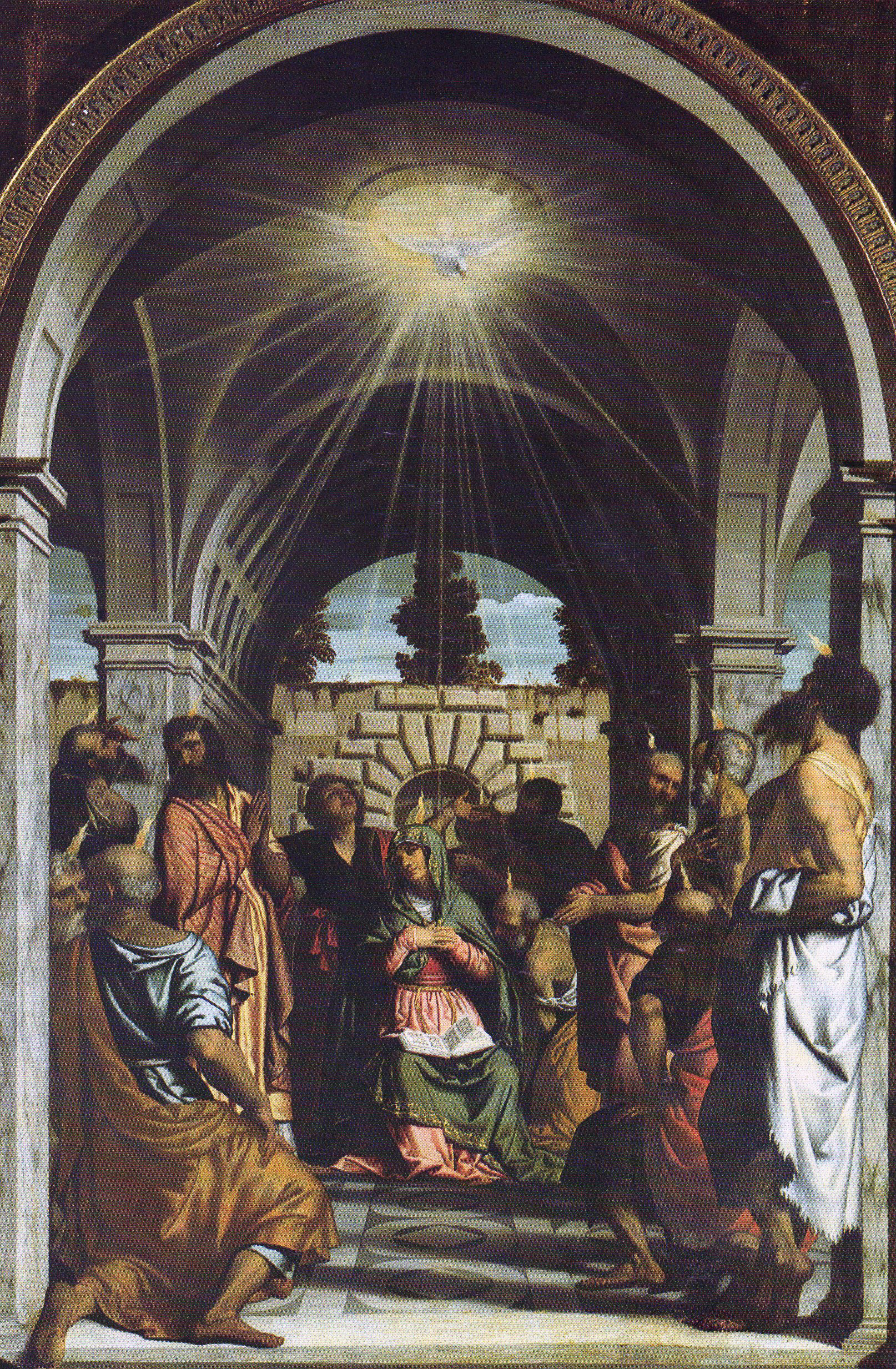
Pentecost (c. 1543–1544) by Moretto da Brescia

Pentecost is an oil on canvas painting by Moretto da Brescia, executed c. 1543–1544, originally painted for San Giuseppe Church in Brescia and now in the city's Pinacoteca Tosio Martinengo.
