= Moretto da Brescia =

Italian painter (c. 1498 – c. 1554)

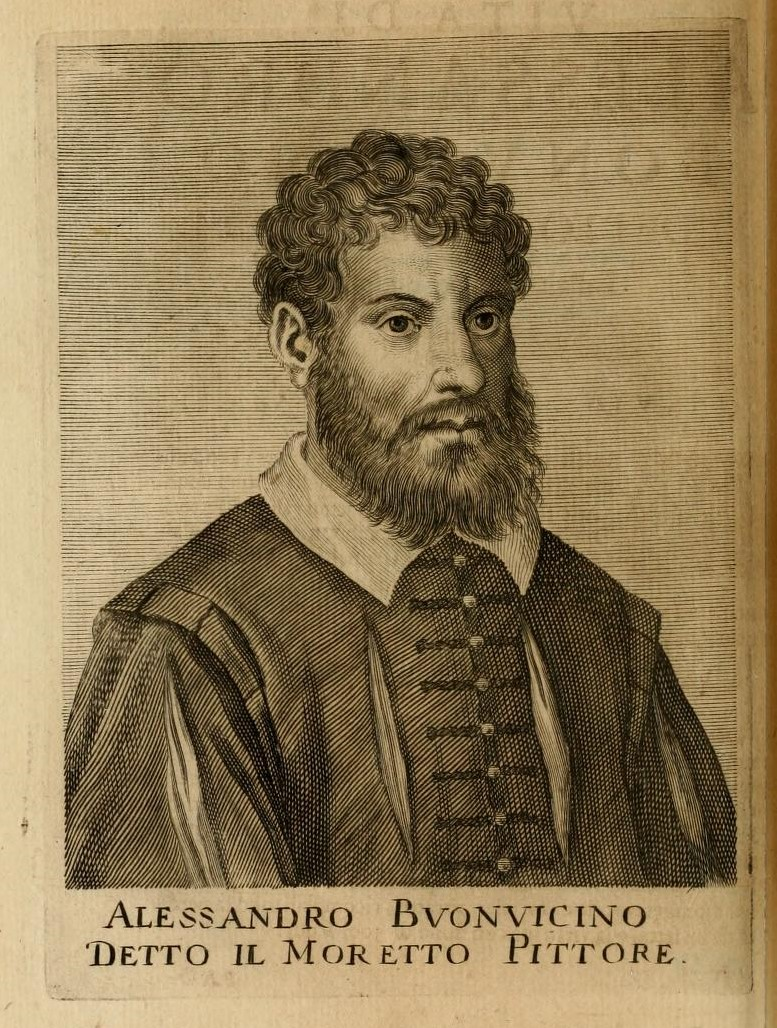
- Portrait of Moretto da Brescia, by Carlo Ridolfi (1654)
- Born: Alessandro Bonvicino c. 1498; Rovato, Italy
- Died: December 1554
- Known for: Painting
- Movement: High Renaissance

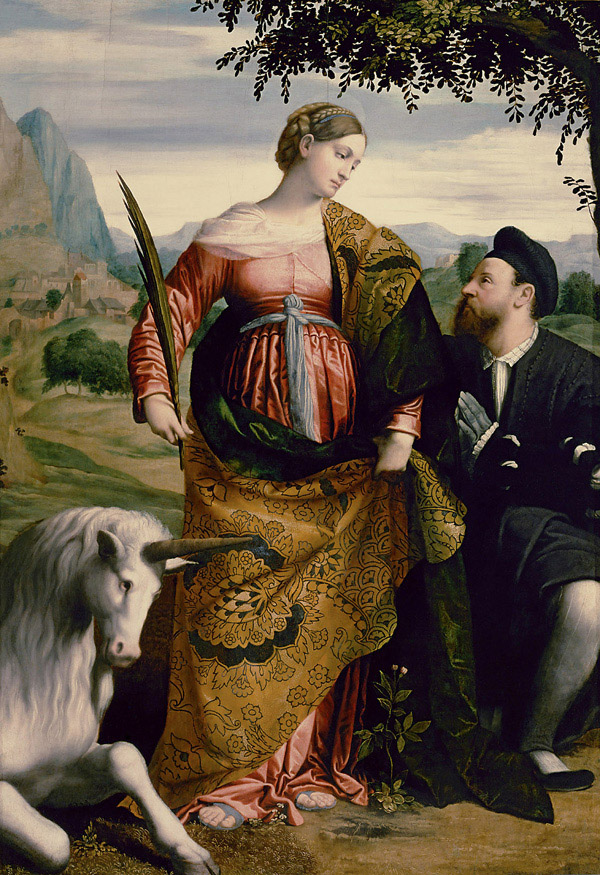
St. Justina, adored by the donor Kunsthistorisches Museum, Vienna

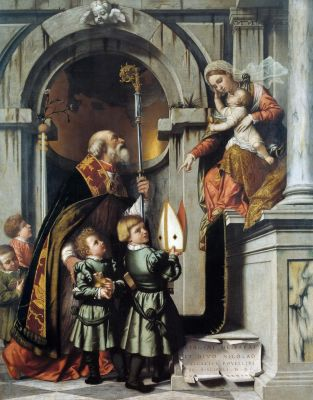
Nicholas of Bari with two children and Virgin (Rovellio Altarpiece)

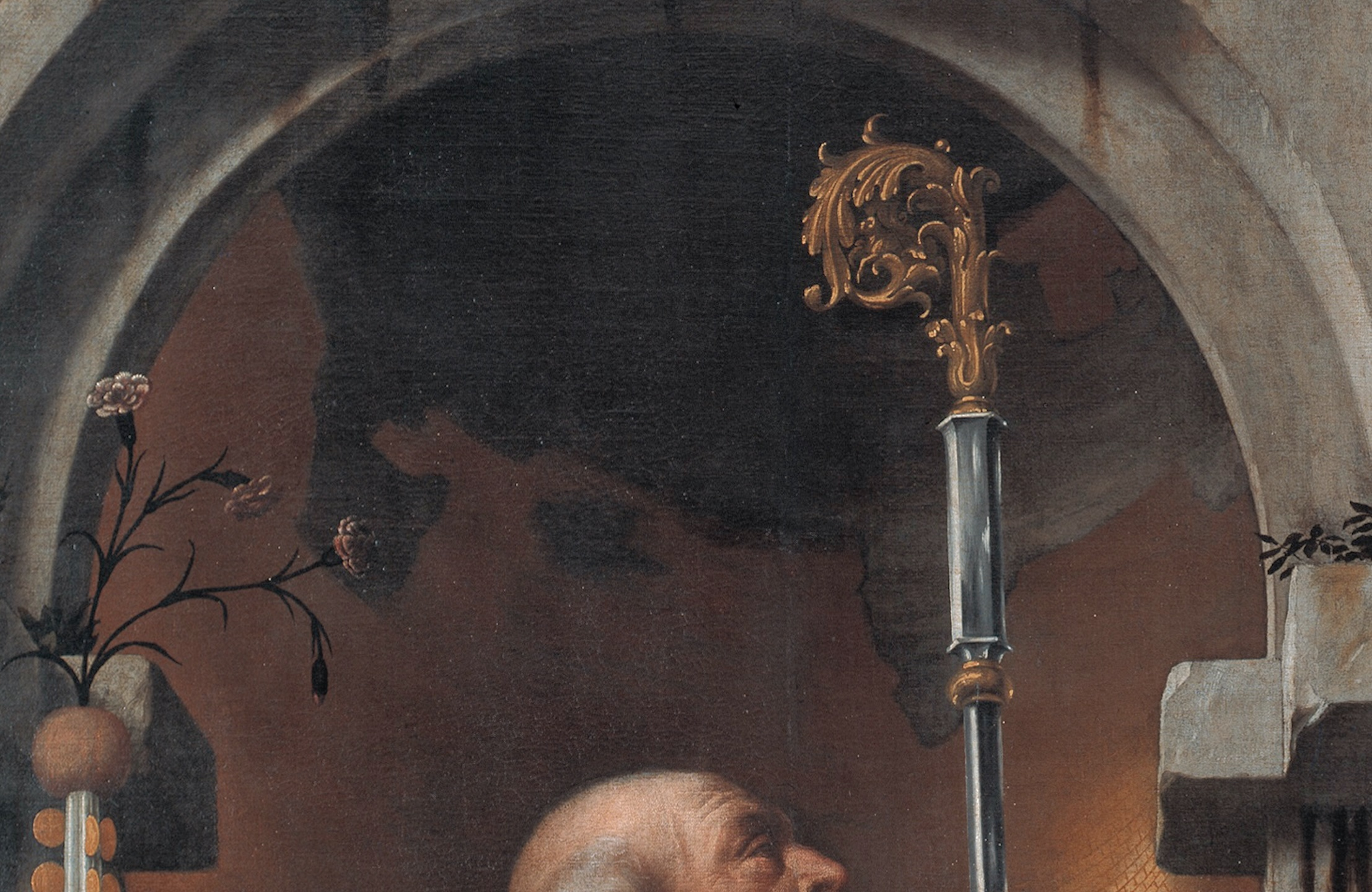
detail of Nicholas of Bari with two children and Virgin showing the map of the Indian Ocean

Alessandro Bonvicino (also Buonvicino) (c. 1498 – possibly 22 December 1554), more commonly known as Moretto, or in Italian Il Moretto da Brescia (the Moor of Brescia), was an Italian Renaissance painter from Brescia, where he also mostly worked. His dated works span the period from 1524 to 1554, but he was already described as a master in 1516. He was mainly a painter of altarpieces that tend towards sedateness, mostly for churches in and around Brescia, but also in Bergamo, Milan, Verona, and Asola; many remain in the churches they were painted for. The majority of these are on canvas, but a considerable number, including some large pieces, are created on wood panels. There are only a few surviving drawings from the artist.

He also painted a few portraits, but these are more influential. A full-length Portrait of a Man in the National Gallery, London, dated 1526, seems to be the earliest Italian independent portrait at full length, all the more unexpected as the subject, though clearly a wealthy nobleman, shows no sign of being from a princely ruling family. This format, and the background of an exterior largely closed off by a column the man leans on, was taken up by his main assistant Giovanni Battista Moroni, who painted mainly portraits and was one of the most important portraitists of the mid-16th century.

He was known as a prominent and pious citizen of the small city of Brescia, belonging to at least two of the most prominent confraternities.

== Biography ==
He was born at Rovato, in Brescian territory, and studied first under Fioravante Ferramola. Others state he trained with Vincenzo Foppa. His brothers Pietro and Jacopo were also painters. He may have been apprenticed to Titian in Venice and modelled his earlier portrait-painting on the Venetian style. On the other hand, the style also resembles that of Giorgione or late Bellini. He conceived a great enthusiasm for Raphael, though he never travelled to Rome; on the other hand, his classical serenity resembles that shown by Leonardo and his followers in Lombardy such as Bramantino. He may have consulted with his contemporary Girolamo Savoldo. Moretto excelled more in sedate altarpieces than in narrative action, and more in oil painting than in fresco, although he painted fine frescoes depicting the idle daughters of Count Martinengo in one of the palaces near Brescia. In 1521, he worked with Girolamo Romanino in the Cappella del Sacramento in the Old Cathedral of Brescia, where Moretto completed a Last Supper, Elijah in the Desert, and a Fall of Manna. He was active during 1522–1524 in Padua.

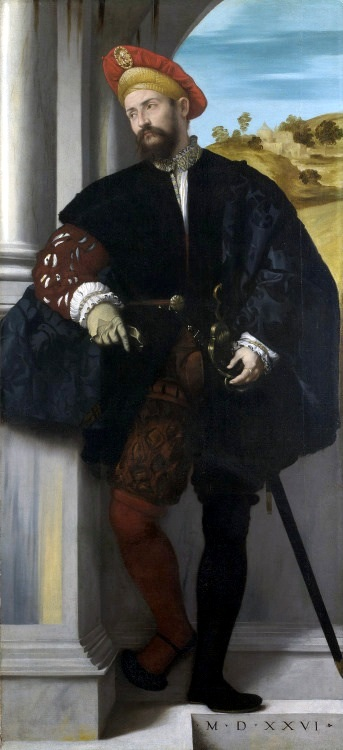
Portrait of a Man, National Gallery, 1526, the earliest Italian full-length portrait

He painted alongside Lorenzo Lotto at Santa Maria Maggiore in Bergamo. In Brescia, he completed a Five Virgin Martyrs and his masterpiece, the Assumption of the Madonna for the church of San Clemente; a Coronation of the Madonna with four saints (c. 1525) for the church of Santi Nazaro e Celso; and a St Joseph for Santa Maria delle Grazie. Moretto's most famous work is his canvas of St Nicholas of Bari presenting two children to Virgin, also known as The Rovellio Altarpiece after its patron, (1539) originally painted for the church of Santa Maria dei Miracoli, but now in the Pinacoteca Tosio Martinengo. This painting contains an image of the Indian littoral in the semi-dome behind Saint Nicholas of Bari. He collaborated with Floriano Ferramola in the decoration of the dome of Brescia Cathedral.

In the Kunsthistorisches Museum, Vienna is a St Justina (once ascribed to Il Pordenone); in the Staedel Museum, Frankfurt, the Madonna Enthroned between Sts. Anthony and Sebastian; in the Berlin Museum, a colossal Adoration of the Shepherds, and a large votive picture (one of the master's best) of the Madonna and Child, with infant angels and other figures above the clouds, and below, amid a rich landscape, two priests; in the National Gallery, Central London, is a St Bernardino and Other Saints. Throughout his career his works display an internal oscillation between the traditions of Venetian painting and the Central Italian schools. Simultaneously he looked at the form and colour of Venetian artists such as Titian and Palma the Elder whilst his classicising, sweet intensity earned him the name "Raphael of Brescia". Though there is some uncertainty regarding his studio, he took on a number of pupils, the most important of whom was the portraitist Giovanni Battista Moroni. He also influenced Callisto Piazza.

Il Moretto was stated to have been a man of great personal piety, preparing himself by prayer and fasting for any great act of sacred art, such as the painting of the Virgin-mother.

== Public collections ==
Moretto is represented in the following collections: National Gallery, London; Metropolitan Museum, New York; Hermitage, St. Petersburg; Kunsthistorisches Museum, Vienna; Staedel Museum, Frankfurt; Gallerie dell'Accademia, Venice; Pinacoteca Tosio Martinengo, Brescia (Annunciation); Pinacoteca Ambrosiana, Milan; National Gallery of Art, Washington; Louvre, Paris; Ashmolean Museum, Oxford; Museum of Fine Arts, Budapest, amongst others.

== Further works ==
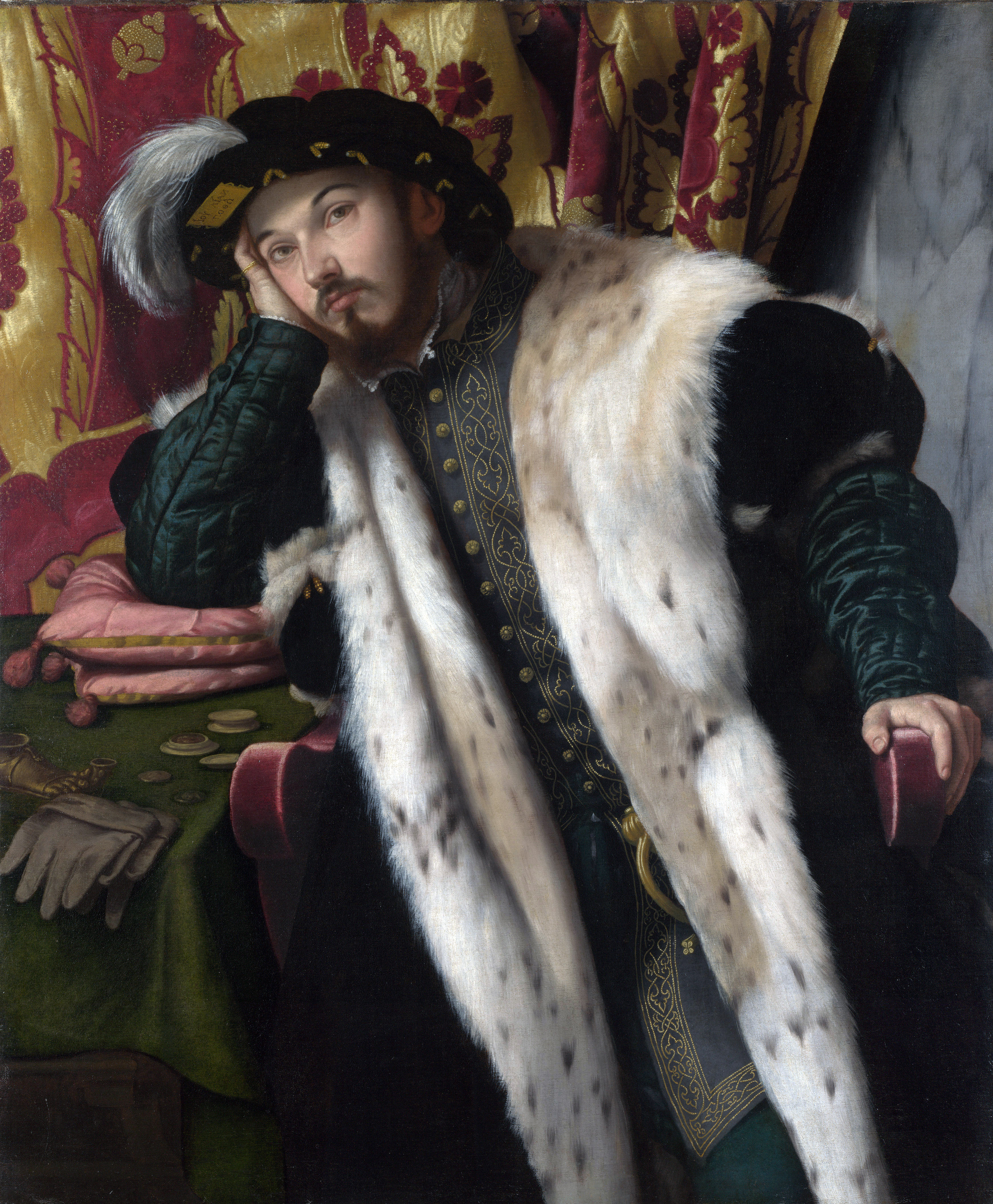
Portrait of Fortunato Martinengo Cesaresco, 1542, London, National Gallery

The Holy Family with Saint Anthony of Padua, oil on panel.

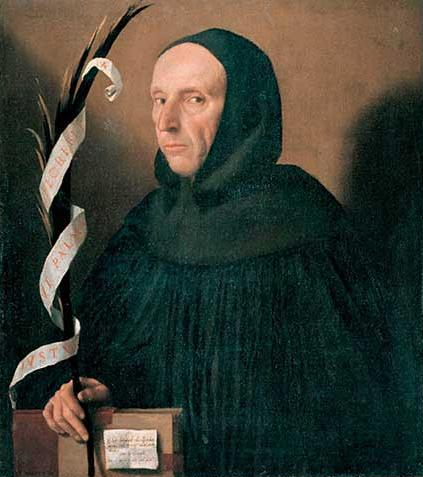
Posthumous portrait of Girolamo Savonarola 1524

== Works ==
- Enthroned Madonna and Child with Saint James the Great and Saint Jerome (1517)
- Christ with the Cross (1518)
- The Dead Christ Adored by Saint Jerome and Saint Dorothy (1520–1521)
- Holy Cross Standard (1520–1521)
- Standard of Our Lady of Mercy (1520–1522)
- Salvation Triptych (1521–1524 or 1527–1528)
- Our Lady of Mount Carmel (c. 1522)
- Assumption of the Virgin (1524–1526)
- Orzinuovi Altarpiece (1525–1530)
- Portrait of a Man (1526)
- Lament over the Dead Christ (1526–1530)
- Sant'Eufemia Altarpiece (1526–1530)
- Supper at Emmaus (c. 1526)
- Madonna and Child with Saint Roch and Saint Sebastian (c. 1528)
- Assumption Altarpiece (1529–1530)
- St Anthony of Padua with Two Saints (1530)
- Saint Anthony Abbot (1530–1534)
- St Justina of Padua with a Donor (c. 1530)
- Madonna and Child with Saint Martin and Saint Catherine (c. 1530)
- Massacre of the Innocents (1531–1532)
- Coronation of the Virgin Altarpiece (c. 1534)
- The Deaf-Mute Filippo Viotti's Vision of the Virgin Mary (c. 1534)
- Annunciation (1535–1540)
- The Assassination of Saint Peter Martyr (1535–1540)
- Portrait of a Gentleman with a Letter (1535–1540)
- Chiesa di San Giovanni Evangelista Organ Case (c. 1535)
- Madonna and Child Enthroned with Saints (1536–1537)
- Rovelli Altarpiece (1539)
- Adoration of the Shepherds with Saints Nazarius and Celsus (1540)
- Salomé (1540)
- Madonna and Child with Saints (Verona, 1540)
- Pralboino Altarpiece (1540–1545)
- Christ in Glory with Saint Peter and Saint Paul (c. 1540)
- Christ with the Eucharist and Saints Cosmas and Damian (c. 1540)
- Madonna and Child with Four Doctors of the Church (c. 1540–1545)
- Madonna and Child with Saints (London, c. 1540–1545)
- Madonna and Child with an Angel (c. 1540–1550)
- Christ with Moses and Solomon (1541–1542)
- Portrait of Fortunato Martinengo Cesaresco (1542)
- Luzzago Altarpiece (1542)
- Mystic Marriage of Saint Catherine (c. 1543)
- Pentecost (1543–1544)
- Madonna and Child with Four Saints (c. 1543)
- Supper in the House of Simon the Pharisee (1544)
- Portrait of an Ecclesiastic (c. 1545)
- Christ with the Eucharist and Saints Bartholomew and Roch (c. 1545)
- Christ and the Angel (c. 1550)
