= Luzzago Altarpiece =

1542 painting by Moretto da Brescia

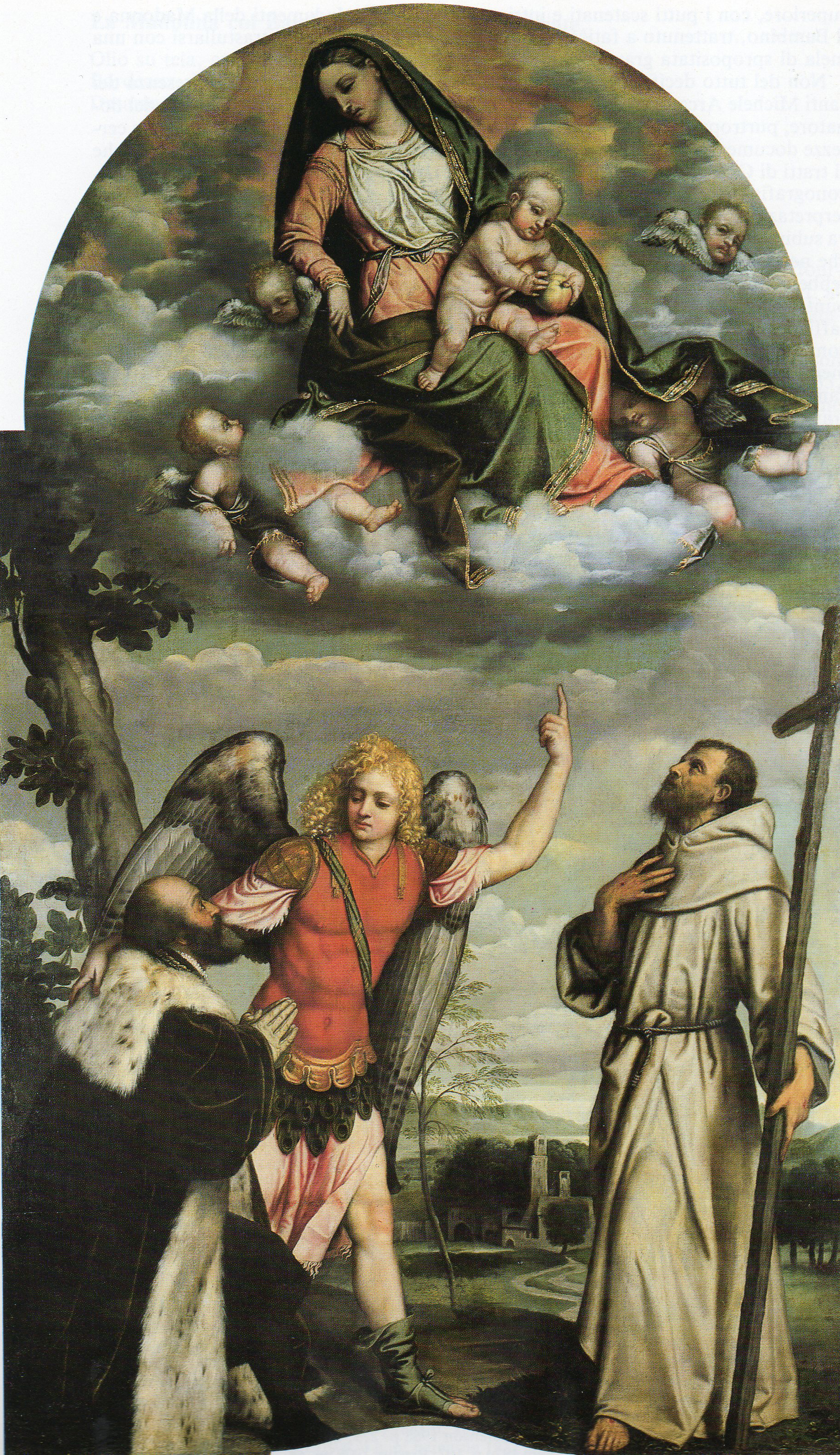
Luzzago Altarpiece (1542) by Moretto da Brescia

The Luzzago Altarpiece is a 1542 oil on canvas painting by Moretto da Brescia, now in the Pinacoteca Tosio Martinengo in Brescia. It was recorded in San Giuseppe church in Brescia in 1630 and moved to its present home in 1868. In the lower register Michael the Archangel points the kneeling donor to the Madonna and Child above, whilst Francis of Assisi stands to the right with a cross.

== Bibliography ==
- (in Italian) Giulio Antonio Averoldi, Le scelte pitture di Brescia additate al forestiere, Brescia 1700
- (in Italian) Paolo Brognoli, Nuova Guida di Brescia, Brescia 1826
- Joseph Archer Crowe, Giovanni Battista Cavalcaselle, A history of painting in North Italy, Londra 1871
- (in Italian) Bernardino Faino, Catalogo Delle Chiese riuerite in Brescia, et delle Pitture et Scolture memorabili, che si uedono in esse in questi tempi, Brescia 1630
- (in Italian) Gustavo Frizzoni, La Pinacoteca comunale Martinengo in Brescia in "Archivio storico dell'arte", Brescia 1889
- György Gombosi, Moretto da Brescia, Basel 1943
- (in Italian) Francesco Paglia, Il Giardino della Pittura, Brescia 1675
- (in Italian) Gaetano Panazza, I Civici Musei e la Pinacoteca di Brescia, Bergamo 1958
- (in Italian) Pier Virgilio Begni Redona, Alessandro Bonvicino - Il Moretto da Brescia, Editrice La Scuola, Brescia 1988
- (in Italian) Carlo Ridolfi, Le maraviglie dell'arte Ouero le vite de gl'illvstri pittori veneti, e dello stato. Oue sono raccolte le Opere insigni, i costumi, & i ritratti loro. Con la narratione delle Historie, delle Fauole, e delle Moralità da quelli dipinte, Brescia 1648
