= Saint Anthony Abbot (Correggio) =

Painting by Antonio da Correggio

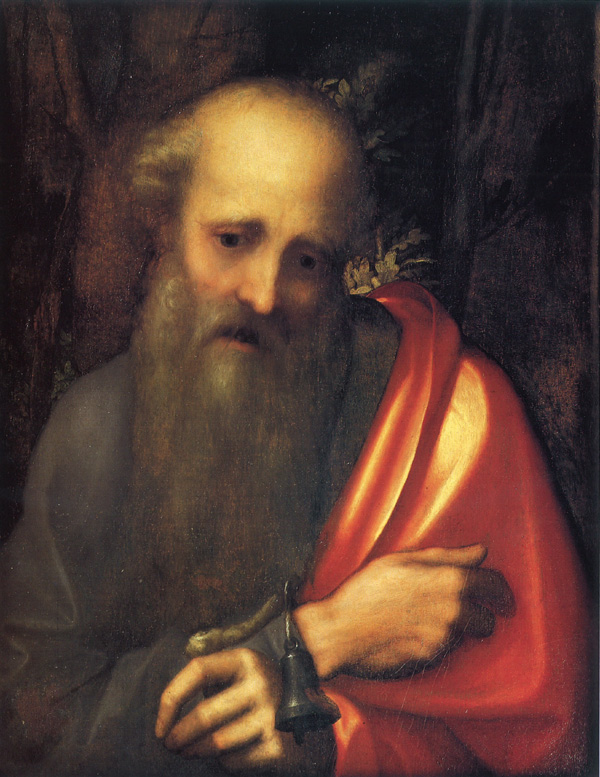

Saint Anthony Abbot is a c.1517-1518 painting of Saint Anthony Abbot by Correggio. It was first attributed to the artist in 1901 by Adolfo Venturi, at which time it was in the Sacristy of the Girolamini in Naples and misattributed to Andrea da Salerno. It moved to the Museo Napoletano in 1907 and is now in the National Museum of Capodimonte.
