= Our Lady of Mount Carmel (Moretto) =

Painting by Moretto da Brescia

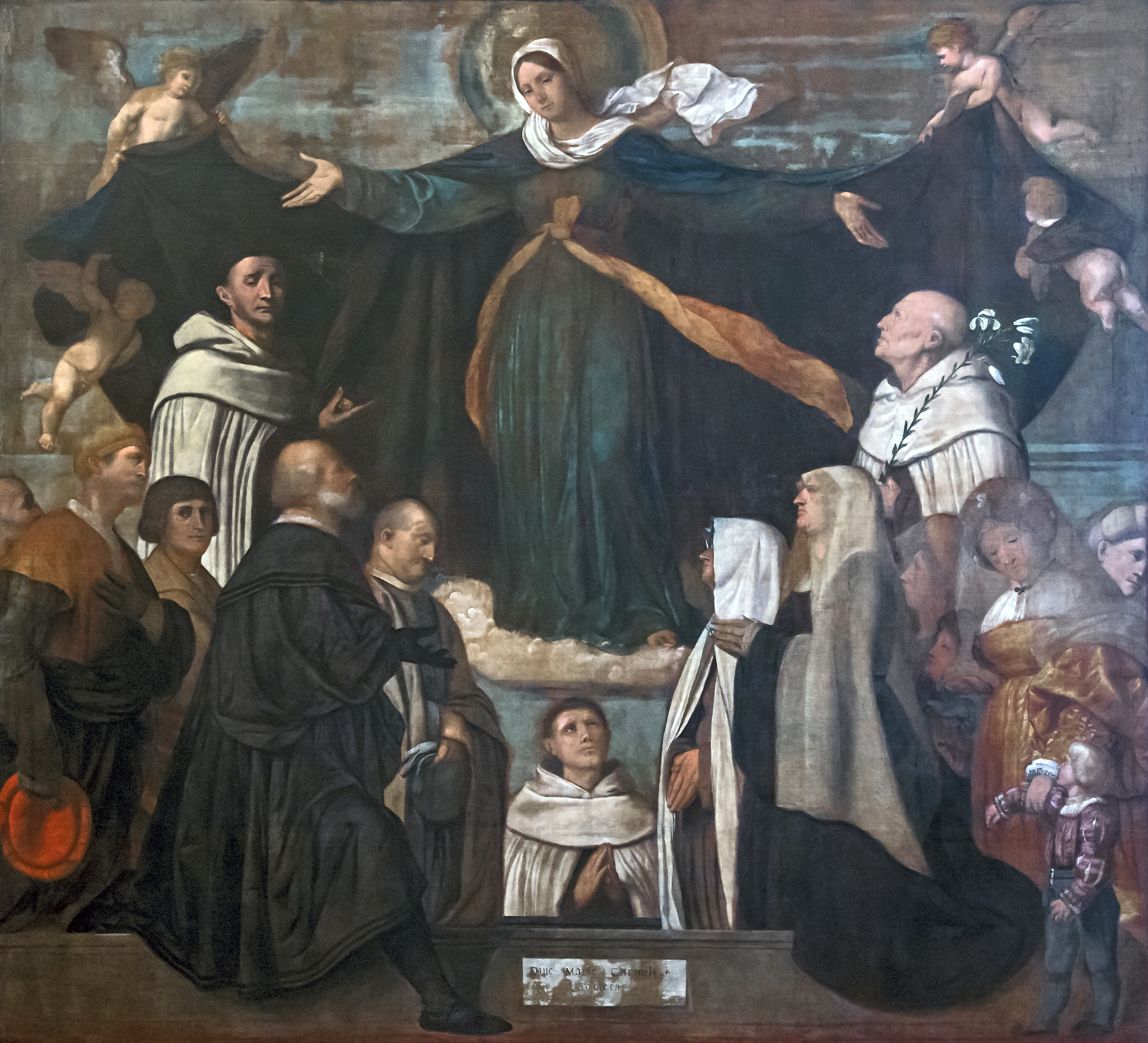
- Artist: Moretto da Brescia
- Year: c. 1522
- Medium: Oil on canvas
- Dimensions: 271 cm × 298 cm (107 in × 117 in)
- Location: Gallerie dell'Accademia, Venice

Our Lady of Mount Carmel is a painting in oils on canvas by Moretto da Brescia, executed c. 1522 and now in the Gallerie dell'Accademia in Venice. It arrived in the Accademia's collection in exchange for two paintings sent to the Tempio Canoviano in Possagno. The painting is one of the most notable works of the artist's youth. Its original location is unknown as the first confirmed written record of the work dates to the 19th century. It was probably in the Confraternity of Our Lady of Mount Carmel's altar in Santa Maria del Carmine church in Brescia; a reference to a "large canvas ... something of a large study in the hand of Moretto" in Bernardino Faino's 1630 guide to Brescian art may be to this work.
