= Saint Anthony Abbot (Moretto) =

C. 1530 painting by Moretto da Brescia

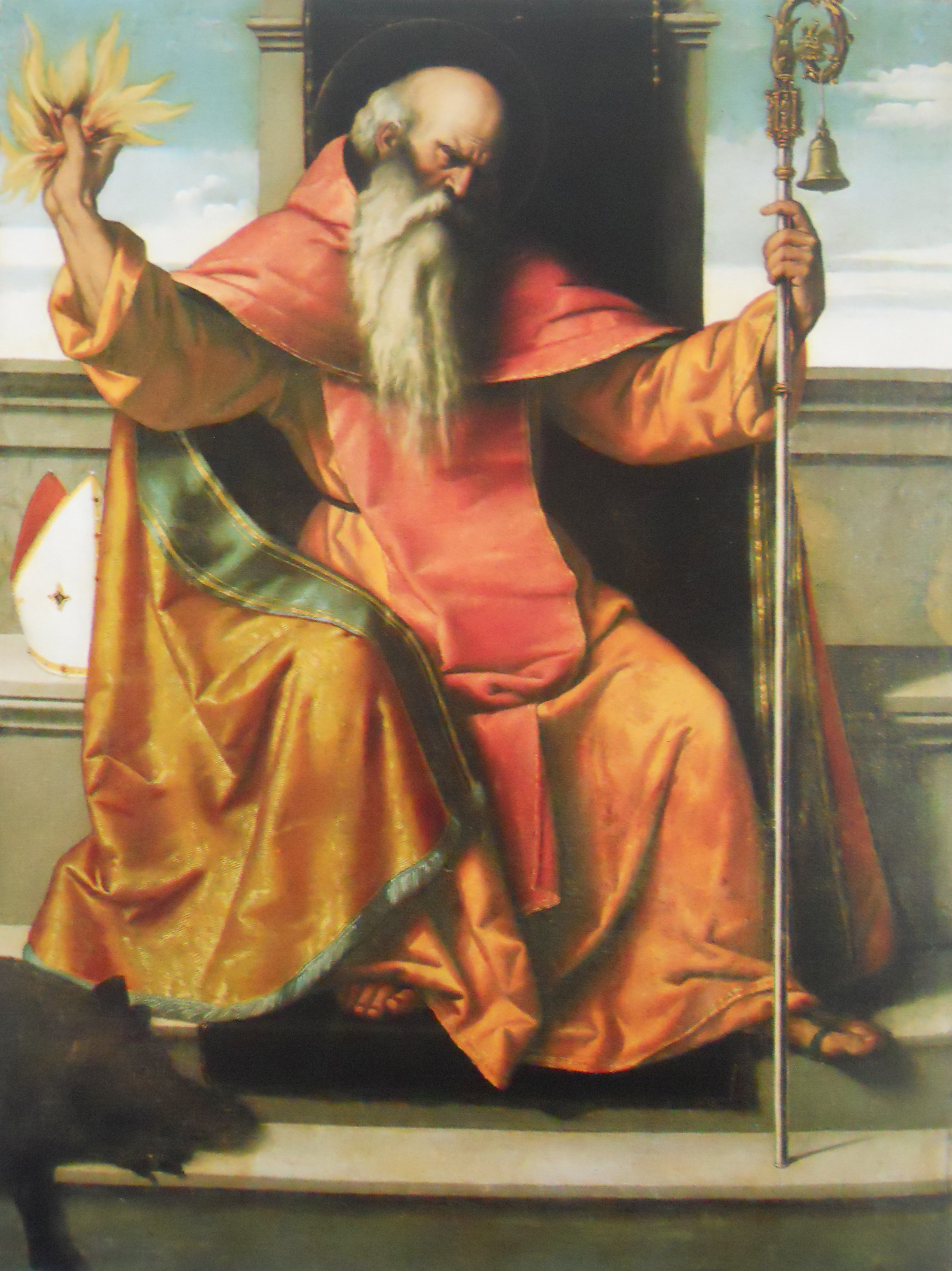
St Antony the Abbot (1530-1534) by Moretto da Brescia

St Antony the Abbot is a 1530-1534 oil on canvas painting of Antony the Great by Moretto da Brescia on display on one of the side-altars in the Santuario della Madonna della Neve in Auro, Casto, Province of Brescia, Italy.

== History ==
The first possible reference to the work is by Francesco Paglia in 1675 - in writing of Casto he states generally that in "Val Sabria beyond these are seen in some little churches works by Romanino and Moretto". It is impossible definitively to link this reference to specific paintings, but the only one still in this area is Moretto's St Antony the Abbot. Its commissioner is unknown, but was probably the town of Casto - the Santuario was built from 1527 onwards after a vision of the Virgin Mary and the canvas dates to the years immediately after this. There is no mention in later sources of the work being moved and so it seems to be on its original site.

== Bibliography (in Italian) ==
- Camillo Boselli, Il Moretto, 1498-1554, in "Commentari dell'Ateneo di Brescia per l'anno 1954 - Supplemento", Brescia 1954
- Pietro Da Ponte, L'opera del Moretto, Brescia 1898
- Roberto Longhi, Quesiti caravaggeschi - II, I precedenti, in "Pinacotheca", anno 1, numeri 5–6, marzo-giugno 1929
- Pompeo Molmenti, Il Moretto da Brescia, Firenze 1898
- Francesco Paglia, Il Giardino della Pittura, Brescia 1675
- Pier Virgilio Begni Redona, Alessandro Bonvicino - Il Moretto da Brescia, Editrice La Scuola, Brescia 1988
