= Madonna and Child with Four Saints (Moretto) =

Painting in the Pinacoteca di Brera

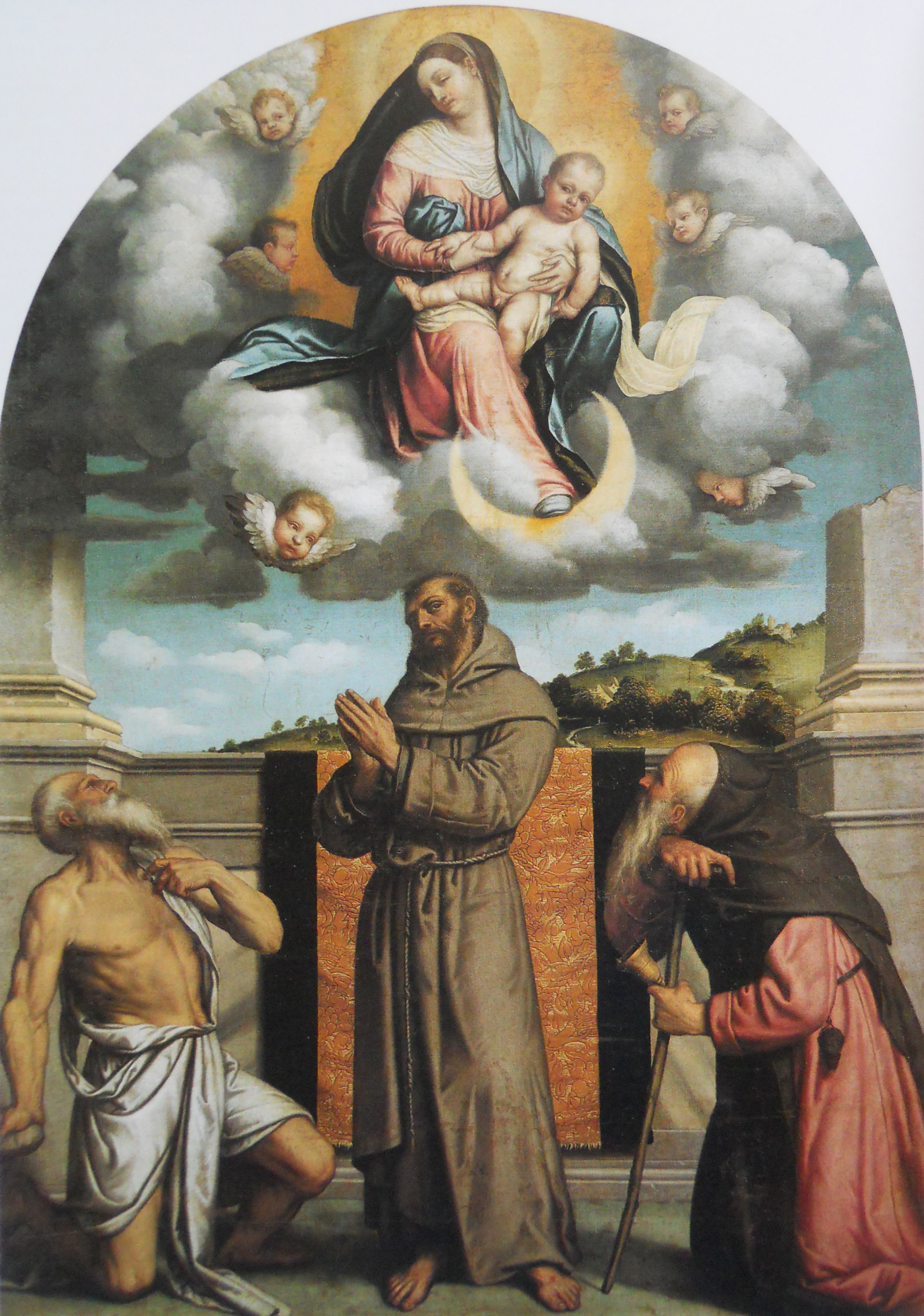
Madonna and Child with Four Saints (c. 1543) by Moretto da Brescia

Madonna and Child with Four Saints is an oil on canvas painting by Moretto da Brescia, executed c. 1543, now in the Pinacoteca di Brera in Milan, to which it moved during the Napoleonic seizures in 1808. It was painted for the church of Santa Maria degli Angeli in Gardone Val Trompia. In the foreground are the saints Jerome, Francis of Assisi and Anthony the Great.
