= Madonna and Child with Four Saints and Donor =

1507 painting by Giovanni Bellini

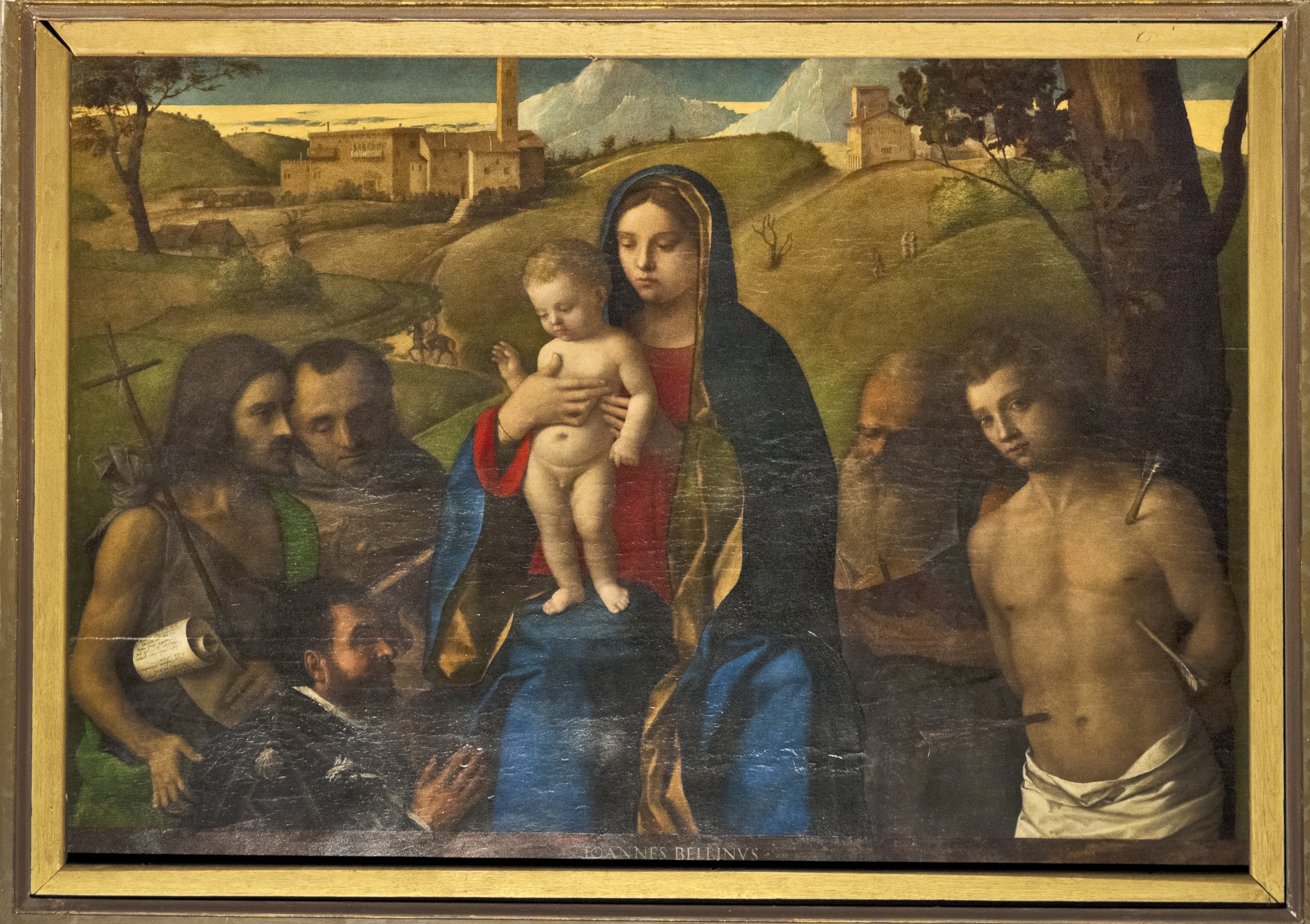
- Artist: Giovanni Bellini
- Year: 1507
- Medium: oil on panel
- Dimensions: 90 cm × 145 cm (35 in × 57 in)
- Location: San Francesco della Vigna, Venice
- Website: WGA entry

Madonna and Child with Four Saints and Donor is a 1507 oil-on-panel painting by the Italian Renaissance artist Giovanni Bellini, measuring 90×145 cm and now in San Francesco della Vigna in Venice. It belongs to the sacra conversazione genre.

To the left are Saints John the Baptist and Francis of Assisi and to the right Saints Jerome and Saint Sebastian. It was probably originally part of the same altarpiece as Christ Crowned with Thorns, another part of which was given to Louis XII of France and is now in Stockholm.

== See also ==
- List of works by Giovanni Bellini
