= Diocesan Museum of Brescia =

Museum in Italy

Coordinates: 45.5412165°N 10.2206161°E

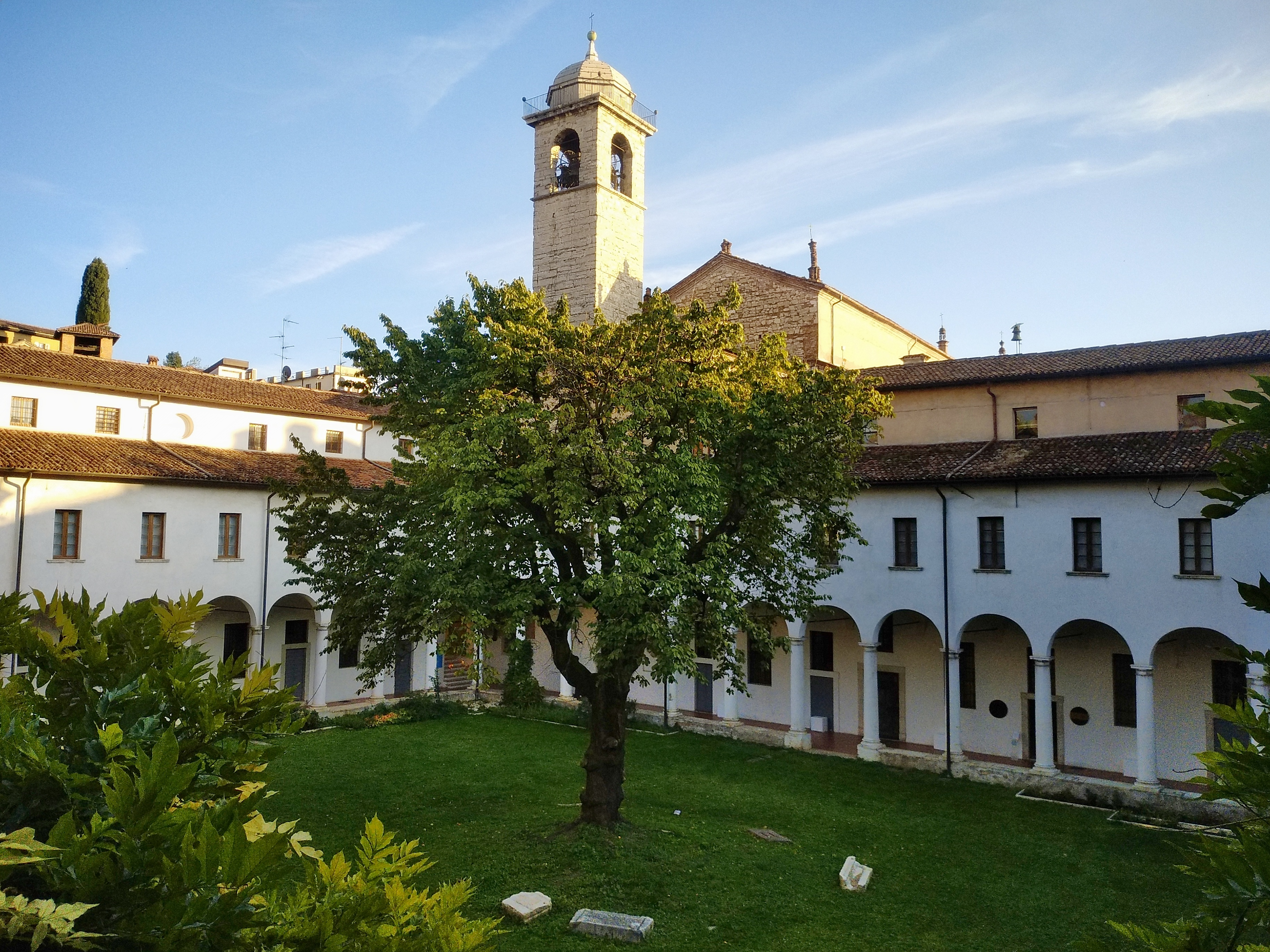
- The cloister of the Diocesan Museum of Brescia
- Established: 1978
- Location: San Giuseppe, Brescia Italy
- Type: Catholic, Sacred art
- Founder: Luigi Morstabilini
- Website: http://www.diocesi.brescia.it/museodiocesano

The Diocesan museum of Brescia is a museum in Italy dedicated to the artistic patrimony of the Diocese of Brescia, and is located in the greater cloister of the Monastery of Saint Joseph in via Gasparo Salò, a short distance from the Piazza della Loggia.

The museum, founded in 1978 by Bishop Luigi Morstabilini, contains numerous works of art from the entire diocesan territory, throughout the province of Brescia, including paintings, sculpture, gold and silver work, and liturgical vestments. In addition, the museum is the usual setting for the exposition of sacred art in the region.

== History ==
The idea for the creation of a museum for the diocese of Brescia first developed in the 1970s. The initiative was taken up by Monsignor Angelo Pietrobelli who identified the greater cloister of Saint Joseph as a site sufficiently spacious and prestigious. The diocese's acquisition of the property was lengthy and complicated, and ultimately required special governmental legislation.

On December 23, 1978, the bishop of Brescia, Luigi Morstabilini, inaugurated a canonical religious foundation known as the "Diocesan Museum of Sacred Art".

On April 21, 1988, the bishop of Brescia, Bruno Foresti, substituted the old statute with a new one, to which, in addition to the collection and preservation of diocesan works of art that might be in danger of dispersion or ruin, he added initiatives of restoration as well as of cultural and educational outreach. Also, thanks to Bishop Foresti, the greater cloister of Saint Joseph was completely restored. The newer statute, revised by Bishop Giulio Sanguineti, was the basis for the civil recognition of the religious foundation.

From February 2010 the Diocesan Museum of Brescia has been recognized by the Italian state as a Fondazione di Religione e di Culto.

== Works ==
The museum is divided into four sections:

- The diocesan gallery;
- Illuminated manuscripts;
- Precious metal works;
- Liturgical vestments.

=== Image gallery ===
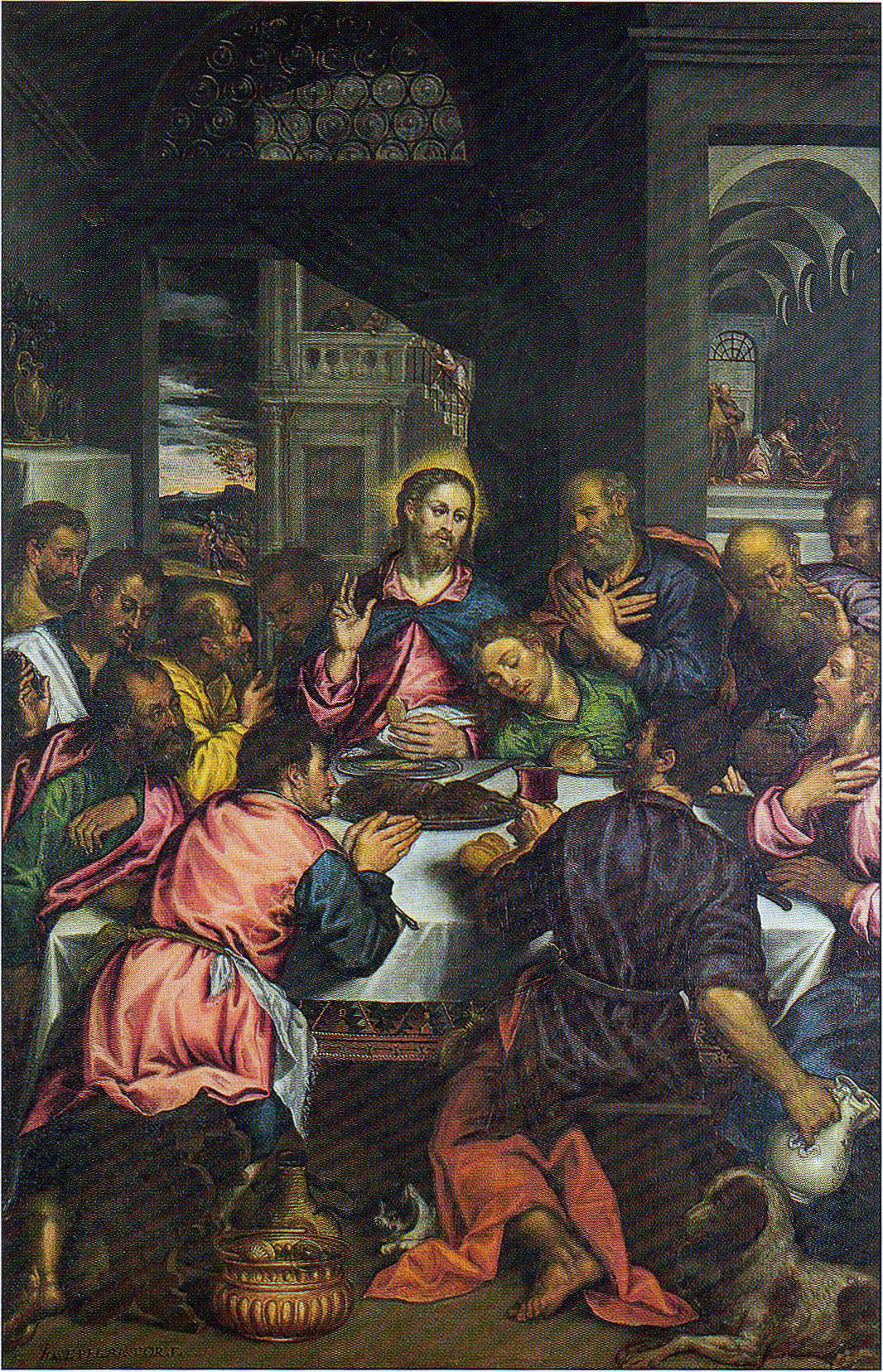
Giuseppe Amatore, the Last Supper, late 16th century

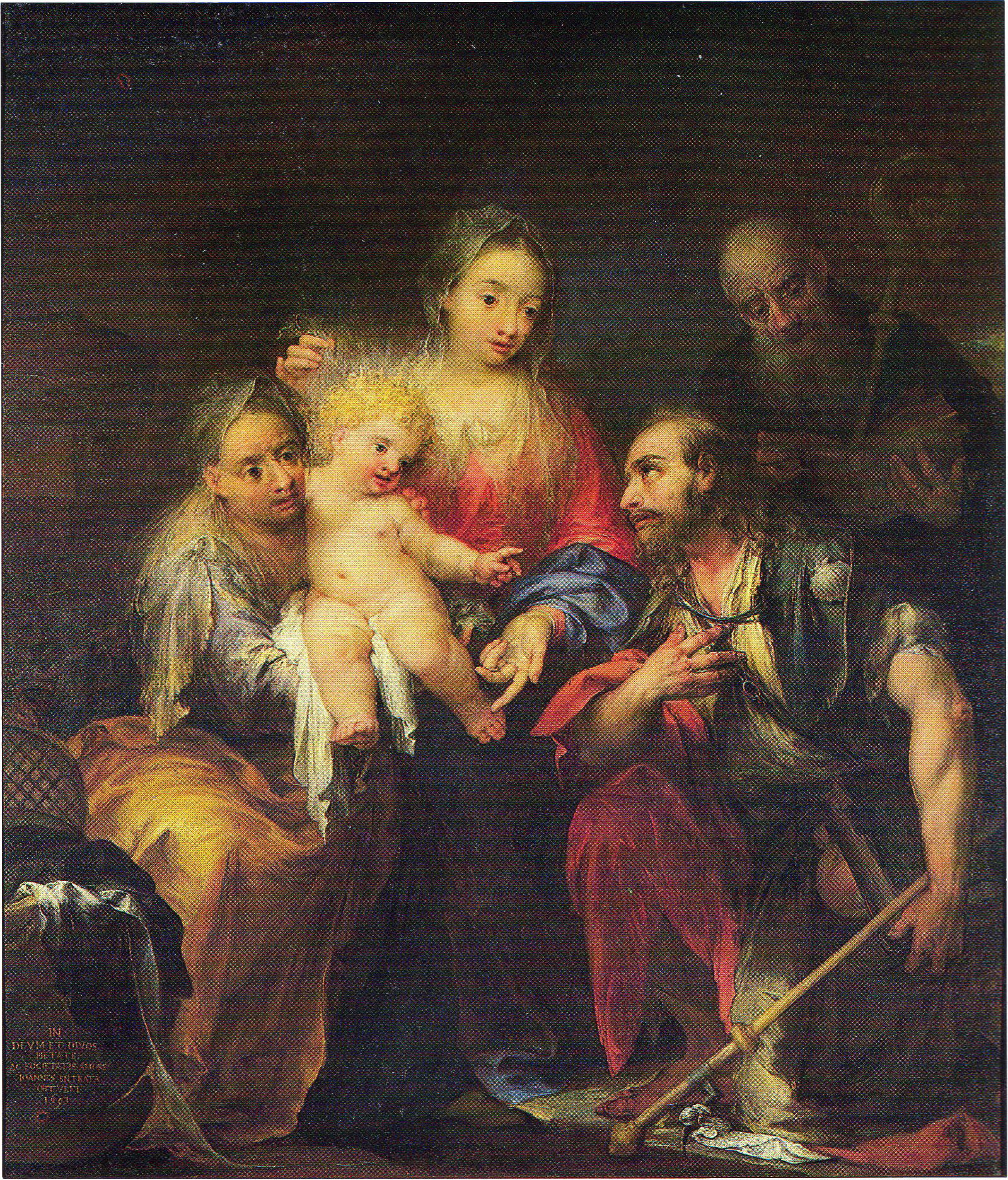
Andrea Celesti, Madonna with among between Saints Anne, James and Benedict, 1693

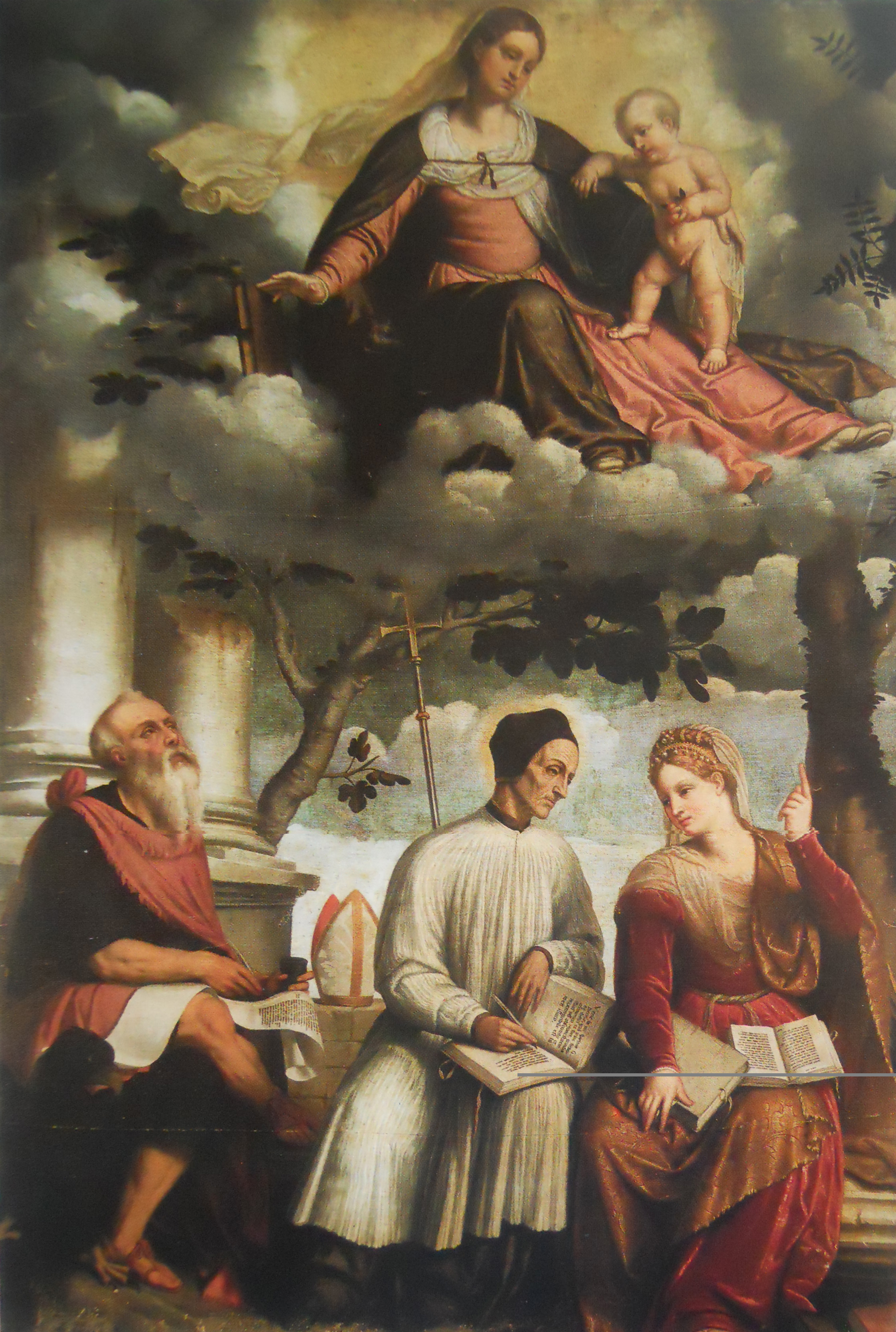
Il Moretto, Madonna with Child in glory with Saint John the Evangelist, Blessed Lorenzo Giustiniani and the allegory of Divine Wisdom, 1545–1550

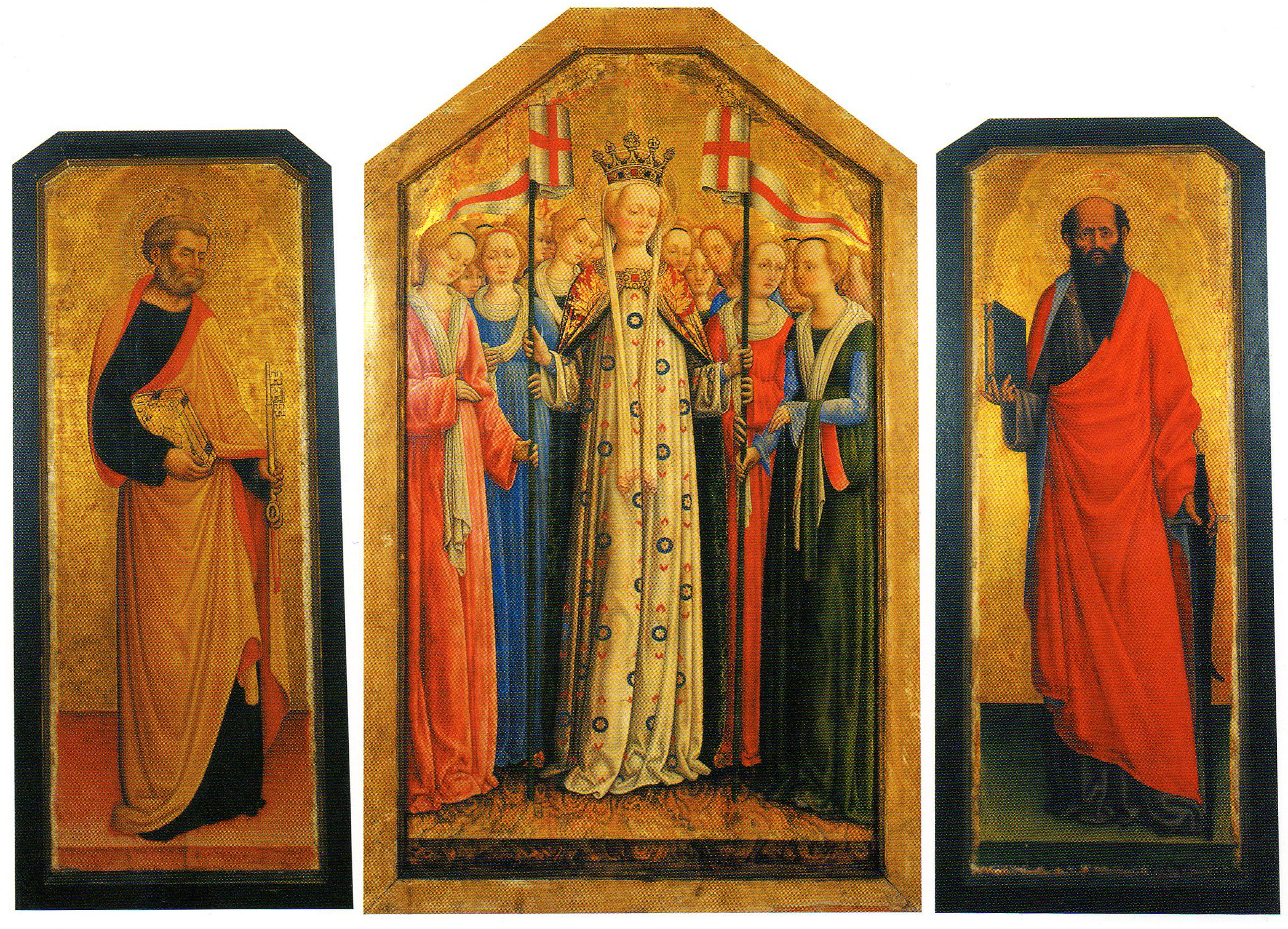
Antonio Vivarini, Polyptych of Saint Ursula, 1440–1445

The gallery contains about a hundred works from the diocese's territory, among which are paintings by Giovanni Battista Pittoni, Il Moretto, Romanino, Andrea Celesti, Giuseppe Tortelli, Pietro Avogadro, Francesco Savanni, Paolo Veneziano and Giambattista Tiepolo.

Giuseppe Amatore

- The Last Supper, late 16th century

Antonio Calegari

- Crucifixion, wooden sculpture, middle of the 18th century

Francesco Capella

- Rebecca at the well

Andrea Celesti

- The Madonna with child among Saints Anne, James, and Benedict

Antonio Cifrondi

- The twelve apostles, oil on canvas, end of the 17th century-beginning of the 18th century

Il Moretto

- The Madonna with Child in glory with Saint John the Evangelist, Blessed Lorenzo Giustiniani and the allegory of Divine Wisdom
- Saint Rock nursed by an angel

Maffeo Olivieri

- The Botticino Crucifix, wood, after 1517

Giovanni Battista Pittoni

- The Madonna with the child Jesus, Saint Leonard and Saint Francis da Paola, oil on canvas, first half of the 18th century

Romanino

- Saint Jerome

Giambattista Tiepolo

- The Baptism of Constantine, oil on canvas, 1757–1759

Tintoretto

- Transfiguration, sketch for the Transfiguration in the Church of Saint Angela Merici.

Paolo Veneziano

- The Madonna with child, middle of the 14th century

Antonio Vivarini

- Polyptych of Saint Ursula, tempera on wood, 1440–1445

Francesco Zugno, Francesco Fontebasso, Battaglioli, Buratto, Maggiotto, Giuseppe Bazzani, Francesco Savanni

- Various Ex votos from the church of Saint Mary of the Patrocinio, 18th century-19th century

=== Illuminated manuscripts ===
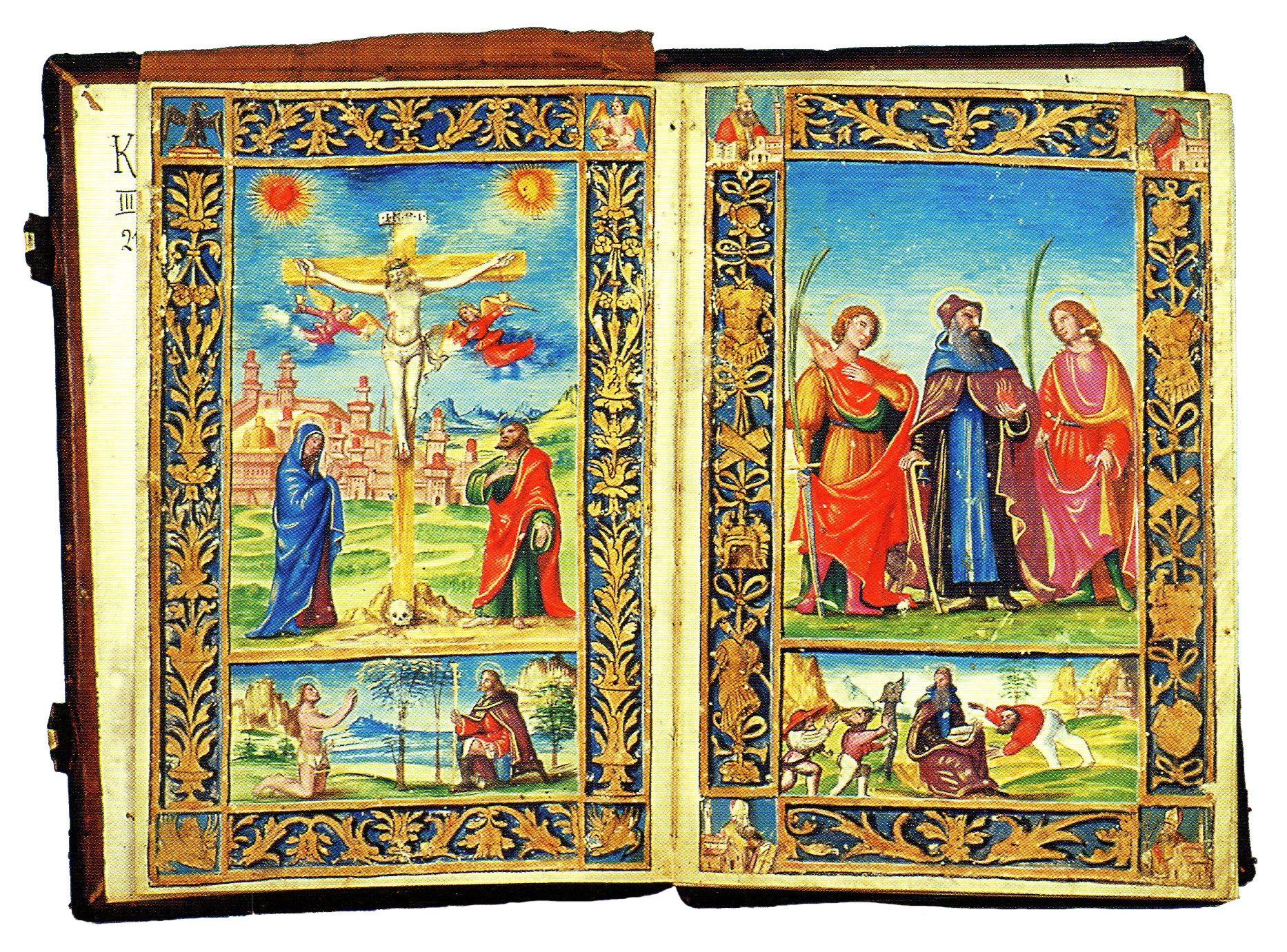
Mariegola di Collio, 1523

This section houses twenty-two illuminated manuscripts, dated from the 12th to the 16th century and coming exclusively from the capitular library of Brescia. The oldest manuscripts were made for Jacopo de Atti, bishop of Brescia (1335–1344), and contain illuminations from the French and Bolognese schools. Of great importance:

- Bonizone da Sutri, De vita christiana o Capitolare 13, late 12th century
- Antifonary, 12th century, contains the first complete version of the office for the Feast of saints Faustino and Giovita, patrons of the city
- The Summa Theologiae of saint Thomas Aquinas, 14th century
- Liturgical books (missals and breviaries) and music (antifonaries and graduals) of the 15th century, decorated with illuminated initial letters, as well as floral and plant motifs
- Mariegola di Collio, 1523, illuminations from an artist influenced by Floriano Ferramola

=== Precious metal works ===
The section containing gold and silver work is organized by era and by type, and displays a considerable collection of liturgical objects dated from the late 15th century to the 19th century. It includes works of silver and gold from Brescia, Venice, and Milan. Of particular interest:

- An architectonic thurible (15th century), embossed copper, of the Lombard-Venetian school
- A chalice decorated with enamels (late 15th century), Italian
- A processional cross (early 16th century) with jutting figures applied to the tops of the arms, and clipeuses decorated with carved figures
- The Gambara reliquary (middle of the 16th century), in ebony and silver, made by a Roman silversmith
- A monstrance (early 17th century), embossed silver with punching, by Girolamo Quadri
- The chalice of Pontevico (1714), a masterpiece in gold, silver, and precious stones by Milanese jeweler Carlo Grossi
- The reliquary of Saint Gaudenzio
- The reliquary of Saint Crispin
- An altar cross, gold-plated with precious stones from the church of Saint Eufemia of Fonte

=== Liturgical vestments ===
The section, inaugurated in 1997, includes a collection of liturgical vestments (end of the 15th – early 19th century), mostly of Venetian and French origin, exhibited by significance, color, symbolism, and style. Of major interest:

- Germanic chasuble (early 16th century);
- Venetian chasuble in damask (1720–1730);
- French chasuble in lampas (1735–1740);
- French chasuble (1750–1760).

The collection also contains a reconstructed loom from the 17th century accompanied by illustrative panels which tell the story of weaving.

== Bibliography ==
- Giacomini Miari Erminia, Mariani Paola, Musei religiosi in Italia, Milano 2005, pp. 127 – 128
- Zuffi Stefano, I Musei Diocesani in Italia. Primo volume, Palazzolo sull'Oglio (BS) 2003, pp. 44 – 48

== See also ==
- Diocese of Brescia
