= Pompeo Ghitti =

Italian painter

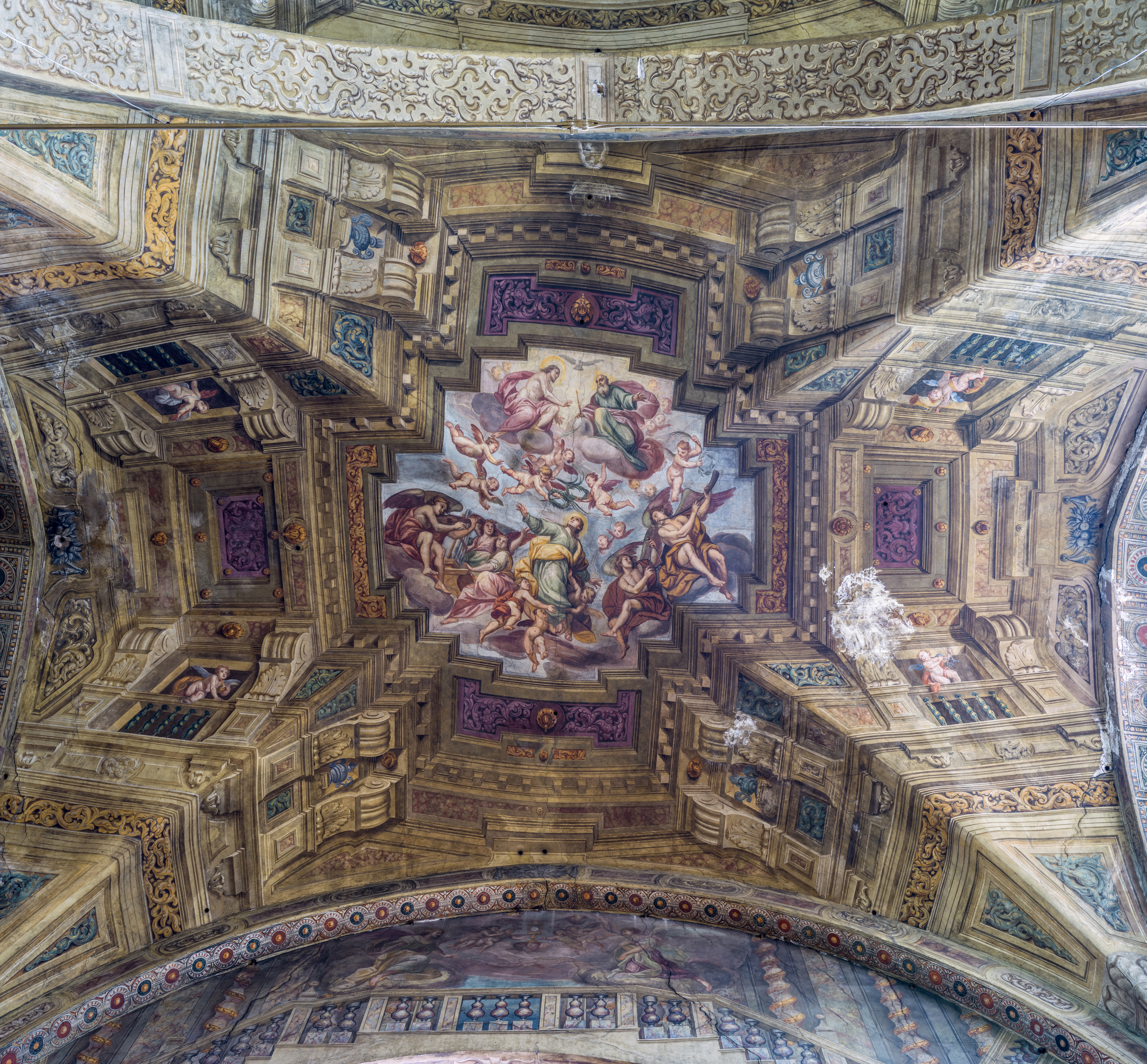
- Paintings by Antonio Sorisene and Pompeo Ghitti 1683 in the Sant'Agata church in Brescia.
- Born: 1631; Marone, Italy
- Died: 1703 or 1704
- Movement: Baroque

Pompeo Ghitti (1631–1703 or 1704) was an Italian painter of the Baroque period, active mainly in and in towns surrounding Brescia.

== Biography ==
He was born in the village of Marone on the shores of Lake Iseo, near Brescia. He was a pupil of the painters Ottavio Amigoni and Angelo Everardi, and then of Giovanni Battista Discepoli. Ghitti contributed to the extensive fresco series in the Brescian church of Santo Corpo di Cristo (or del Corpus Domini, now called Santo Cristo). He painted two altarpieces, the Last Supper (1681, 2nd chapel to left) and Glory of St. Carlo Borromeo with the saints Stephen Martyr, Francis of Assisi, Anthony of Padua, & Rocco (1668, 2nd chapel right) for the parochial church of Santa Maria Assunta in Ghedi. He painted the main altarpiece with a St. Carlo Borromeo praying to Virgin with insertion of an image of the Trinity by Pietro Scalvini for the brothers of the it:Confraternita della Santissima Trinità dei pellegrini's church in Brescia. The Confraternity's church, the Santissima Trinità dei Pellegrini, is now a theatre, called the Teatro San Carlino.

In the castle overlooking the town of Cazzago San Martino, in the salone delle adunanze, the decoration includes landscapes by the painter Sorisene with figures by Pompeo Ghitti (1669). The counterfacade of the Brescian church of S. Maria in Calchera is painted by Ghitti, and depicts a miracle of Bernardino da Feltre. Ghitti also painted frescoes in the Church of Santa Maria degli Angeli in Gardone Val Trompia (Italian: Basilica di Santa Maria degli Angeli).

Among his pupils were Pietro Avogadro and Giovanni Antonio Capello.
