= Francesco Cairo =

Italian painter (1607-1665)

Cavalier Francesco Cairo COSML
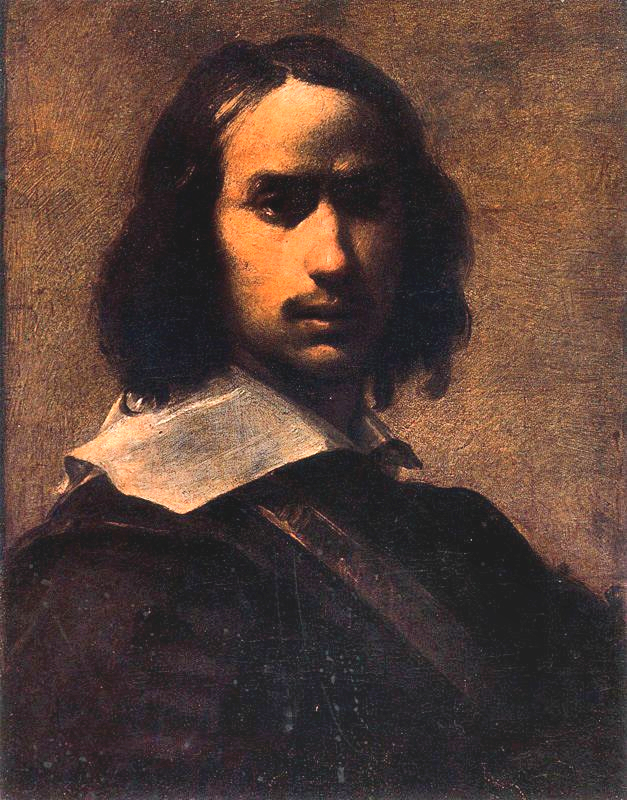
- Self-portrait
- Born: Pier Francesco Cairo; 26 September 1607; Milan, Duchy of Milan
- Died: 27 July 1665 (aged 57); Milan, Duchy of Milan
- Other name: Il Cavalière del Cairo
- Education: Morazzone
- Known for: Painting
- Movement: Baroque

Francesco Cairo (26 September 1607 – 27 July 1665), also known as Francesco del Cairo, was an Italian Baroque painter active in Lombardy and Piedmont. He is also known as Il Cavalière del Cairo, because in Turin, he received the Order of Saints Maurice and Lazarus in recognition of his merit.

Cairo led a successful career as court painter at Turin and painted many large altarpieces for religious orders; the range of his stylistic development during nearly 40 years is enormous, yet his early cabinet pictures, of macabre and morbid subjects, are often regarded as some of his most fascinating work. They marked the end of the pestanti painters, and the sentiments that distinguished early 17th-century Milanese painting.

== Life and work ==
=== Before 1639: early years in Lombardy and as court painter at Turin ===
Cairo’s teacher is usually supposed to have been Morazzone, a stylistically credible idea. Cairo’s earliest known altarpiece, Saint Teresa’s Vision of Saints Peter and Paul (late 1620s; Pavia, Certosa di Pavia, New Sacristy), was previously attributed to Morazzone and is indebted to him in its colouring, based upon sharply lit oranges, browns and greens. The picture also shows the influence of the late work of Giovanni Battista Crespi. Cairo’s Death of the Blessed Andrea Avellino (c. 1630; Sant'Antonio Abate, Milan) is a more integrated composition, its sources less apparent. These works represent mystical visions with the intense emotion that is characteristic of Baroque devotional iconography. Their dramatic lighting, richly worked surfaces and shallow pictorial space are typical of Milanese painting of the 1620s, yet a new clarity of space and gesture suggests a fresh response to early 17th-century Bolognese art. They were painted for religious orders, and the Carmelites in particular remained important patrons of the artist.

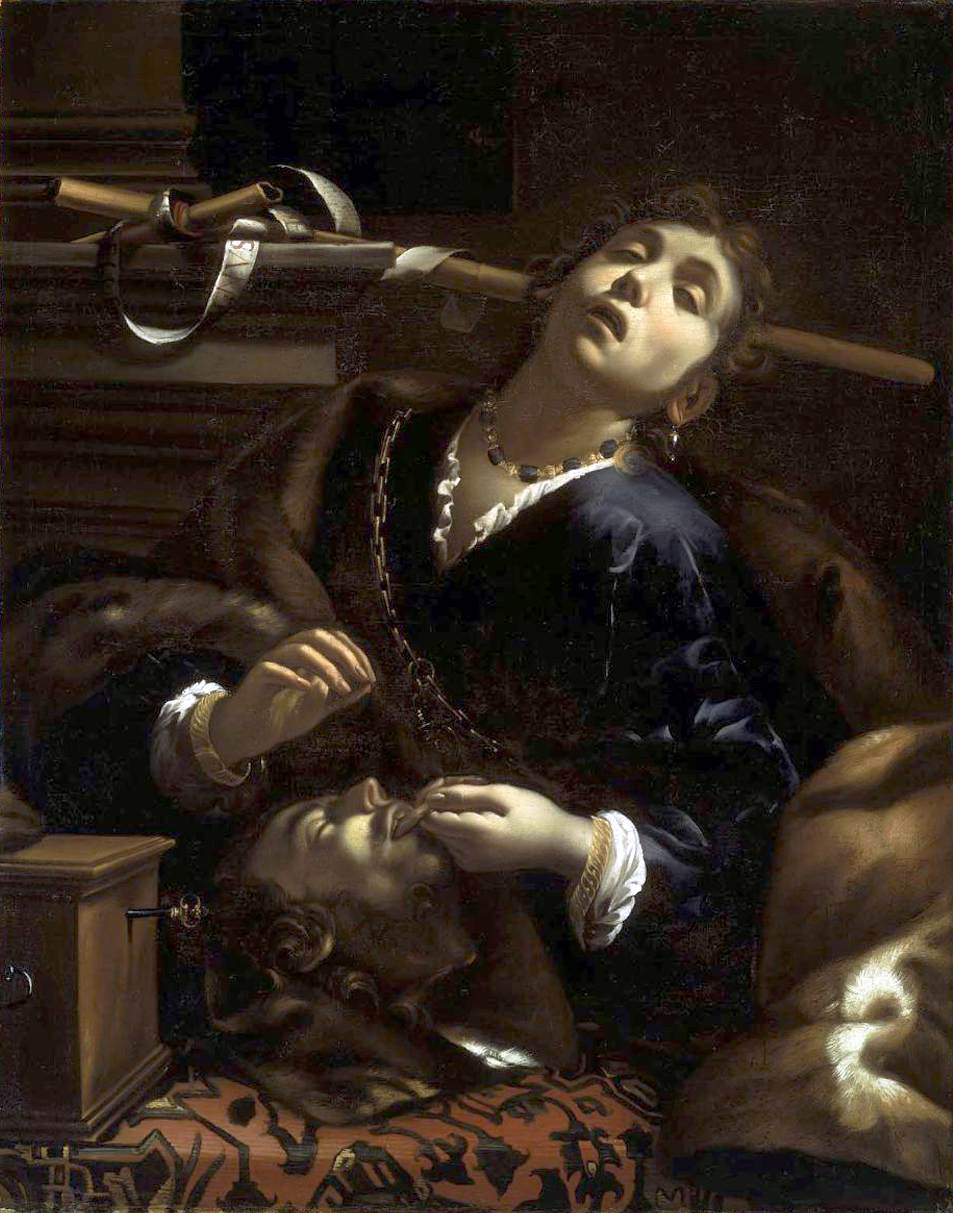
Herodias with the Head of St John the Baptist, oil on canvas (Boston, Museum of Fine Arts)

In 1633 Cairo was called to Turin as court painter to Victor Amadeus I, Duke of Savoy. A group of pictures now in the Galleria Sabauda, Turin, is mentioned in the 1635 inventory of the Savoy collection and probably post-dates his summons there; included are Christ in the Garden of Gethsemane (other versions in Milan, Pinacoteca di Brera; Milan, Sforza Castle), Herodias with the Head of St John the Baptist (Turin, Galleria Sabauda; other versions in Boston, MA, Museum of Fine Arts; New York, Metropolitan Museum of Art; Vicenza, Museo Civico di Arte e Storia), a Martyrdom of Saint Agnes and a Death of Lucretia. These pictures typify one aspect of Cairo’s art: they are rather small, rarely more than a metre high, with one or, at most, two figures placed close to the picture plane; they are carefully and smoothly painted with a sophisticated palette based on muted browns, oranges and greens, sharpened by whites and yellows. In most cases they depict an equivocal moment of extreme emotion, and the painted series of tragic heroines reveals a morbid fascination with violence and death. The executioner plunges his knife into the pallid breast of an ecstatic Saint Agnes; in a disturbingly erotic work a richly jewelled Herodias, veiled in dark shadows, half swoons in rapture or in anguish over the lurid severed head of the dead Baptist.

Stylistically similar works, such as the anguished, spectral Saint Francis in Ecstasy (Milan, Sforza Castle) or the eerie Dream of Saint Joseph (Berlin, Bode Museum), are probably close in date. In both devotional and lay literature of the period there are specific parallels and sources for this expression of the senses pushed beyond the limits of reason. Such a sumptuous mixture of the dramatic, the macabre and the ecstatic was popular with private collectors.

By the late 1630s Cairo’s pictures were collected in Venice, and his reputation was spreading to England. His success at the ducal court in Turin was marked by his enrolment in the Order of Saints Maurice and Lazarus in 1634 and by the grant by the Duke of Savoy of a regular stipend in 1635. In 1637 he went to Rome at the expense of the ducal family. He remained there a year, and encountered the works of Pietro da Cortona, Guido Reni and of the Caravaggisti.

=== 1639–47: further activity in Lombardy and Turin ===
By early 1639 Cairo was back in Turin. Around 1640 he married a well-born Piedmontese, Ludovica Piossasca di Sculaghi. From 1641 to 1643 several documents attest to his presence in Lombardy, where he completed altarpieces for the Certosa of Pavia and a church at Casalpusterlengo. In 1644 Christine of France, the widow of Victor Amadeus I, ordered his return to regular paid service in Turin.

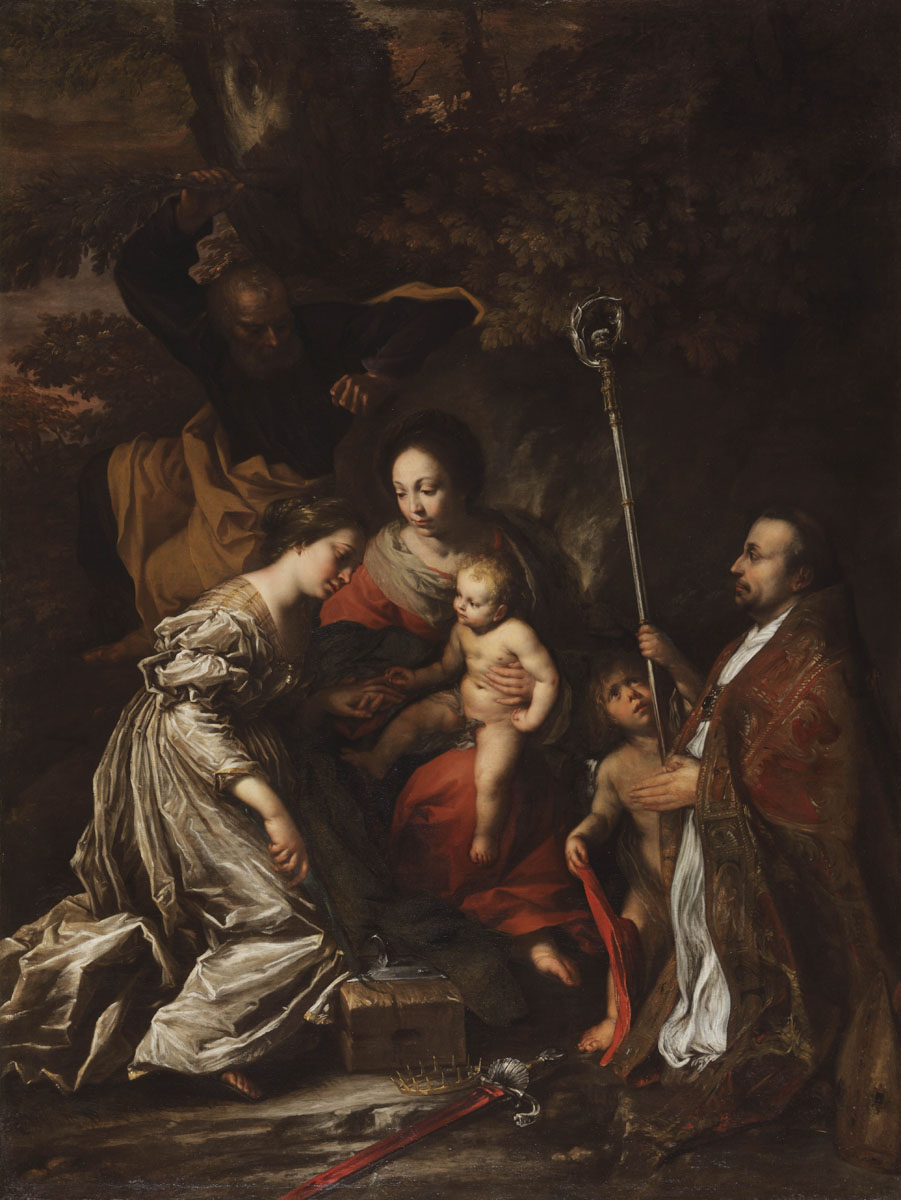
Mystic Marriage of Saint Catherine, oil on canvas (Toulouse, Musée des Augustins)

The works dating from his return north from Rome mark a decisive stylistic change. The concentrated experience of painting in Rome undoubtedly caused Cairo to renew his art; he was influenced by the grand, decorative style and warm Venetian colour of Pietro da Cortona and by the glowing surfaces and tender sentiment of Genoese painters, particularly Giovanni Benedetto Castiglione and the Fleming Anthony van Dyck, who had worked in Genoa. Cairo’s Mystic Marriage of Saint Catherine (early 1640s; Toulouse, Musée des Augustins) is inspired by Correggio’s Madonna of Saint Jerome (1527–8; Galleria nazionale di Parma); another altarpiece, the Virgin and Child with Saints Catherine of Alexandria and Catherine of Siena (completed by 1645; Pavia, Certosa), which is indebted to van Dyck for the figures, is grander and more Roman. The composition is clear and symmetrical, and the background is enriched with noble Classical architecture. Thus by the early 1640s Cairo’s art had become less idiosyncratic and began to follow the dominant tendencies of Seicento painting. His colours became lighter in tone, no longer playing on sharp contrasts of light and dark, and his figures fuller, inhabiting a more ample pictorial space. His technique also changed, the pigments becoming thinner and his brushwork looser and more painterly.

The pictures painted for Christine of France in the mid-1640s, Moses Brought to Pharaoh’s Daughter (completed by 1645; Turin, Galleria Sabauda), Christ Appearing to Saints Christine and Valentine (begun 1645; Turin, Galleria Sabauda) and the Virgin Appearing to Petrina Tesio ( 1647; Savigliano, Santuario Apparizione), developed the new tendencies of Cairo’s art. The grandeur of Saints Augustine, Francis, Bernard and Dominic (San Vittore al Corpo, Milan) suggests that this picture may date from the end of the 1640s; the figures are framed by monumental niches and unite the striking realism of Cairo’s early works with the greater dignity and richer, more brilliant surfaces of the period around the middle of the century. This change in style, which occurred in the work of other Milanese painters during the 1640s, was accompanied in Cairo’s art by a change in expression. The formal and emotional excesses of his earlier pictures lessened. His paintings for private patrons during the 1640s illustrate this new direction. The languidly voluptuous Death of Lucretia (Madrid, Museo del Prado) recalls similar subjects of tragic heroines by Guido Reni; the Death of Cleopatra (Milan, Biblioteca Ambrosiana) and Pandora (Pavia, Pinacoteca Malaspina) reflect a study of 16th-century Venetian art.

=== 1648–65: later years in Milan ===
By 1648 Cairo had left Turin and had returned permanently to Milan. However, he continued until 1651 to hold property granted him in 1646 by Christine of France (which carried with it the title of count); and in 1652 her son Charles Emmanuel II, Duke of Savoy, commissioned Cairo to advise about pictures on the Milanese art market. In 1654 he received payment for an altarpiece painted for the Venetian Carmelite church, the Ecstasy of Saint Teresa (Scalzi, Venice). The sharp yellows, browns, reds and blues of this turbulent, visionary work are an interpretation of the neo-Venetian colouring of van Dyck. In other pictures the influence of 16th-century Venetian painting deepened and became more direct; he knew Venetian paintings in Milan and Turin and may also have visited Venice. Already by the late 17th century and the early 18th, critics described Cairo’s later work as inspired by Titian and Paolo Veronese. His portraits particularly were considered Venetian; one of the two so far identified, the Portrait of a Man (Milan, Biblioteca Ambrosiana), is markedly Venetian in character, with its streaked sky, studied reflections and rich colouring.

Otherwise Cairo continued to draw on the same Emilian and Genoese sources as in the 1640s. Van Dyck remained a constant inspiration, as is shown in Cairo’s Saint Francis Xavier Preaching to the Indians (early 1650s; San Bartolomeo, Modena) and the Assumption of the Virgin ( 1662; San Giulio d’Orta, San Giulio all’Isola). Central Italian influences are also apparent. The Martyrdom of Saint Stephen exists in two versions (one dated 1660; Casale, Santo Stefano; the other Milan, Santo Stefano), both close variants of Pietro da Cortona’s rendering of the same subject (Saint Petersburg, Hermitage Museum). The mark of Cairo’s late style is the increasing thinning out of form and pigment so that his painting loses its earlier solidity. His best late works are sensitive and diaphanous, with a high-keyed range of thinly applied blues, reds and yellows; others show a marked decline and can be vacuously derivative. Cairo died in Milan on 27 July 1665. Ludovico Antonio David, Giulio Coralli, and Pietro Scalvini were among his pupils.

=== Critical reception and posthumous reputation ===
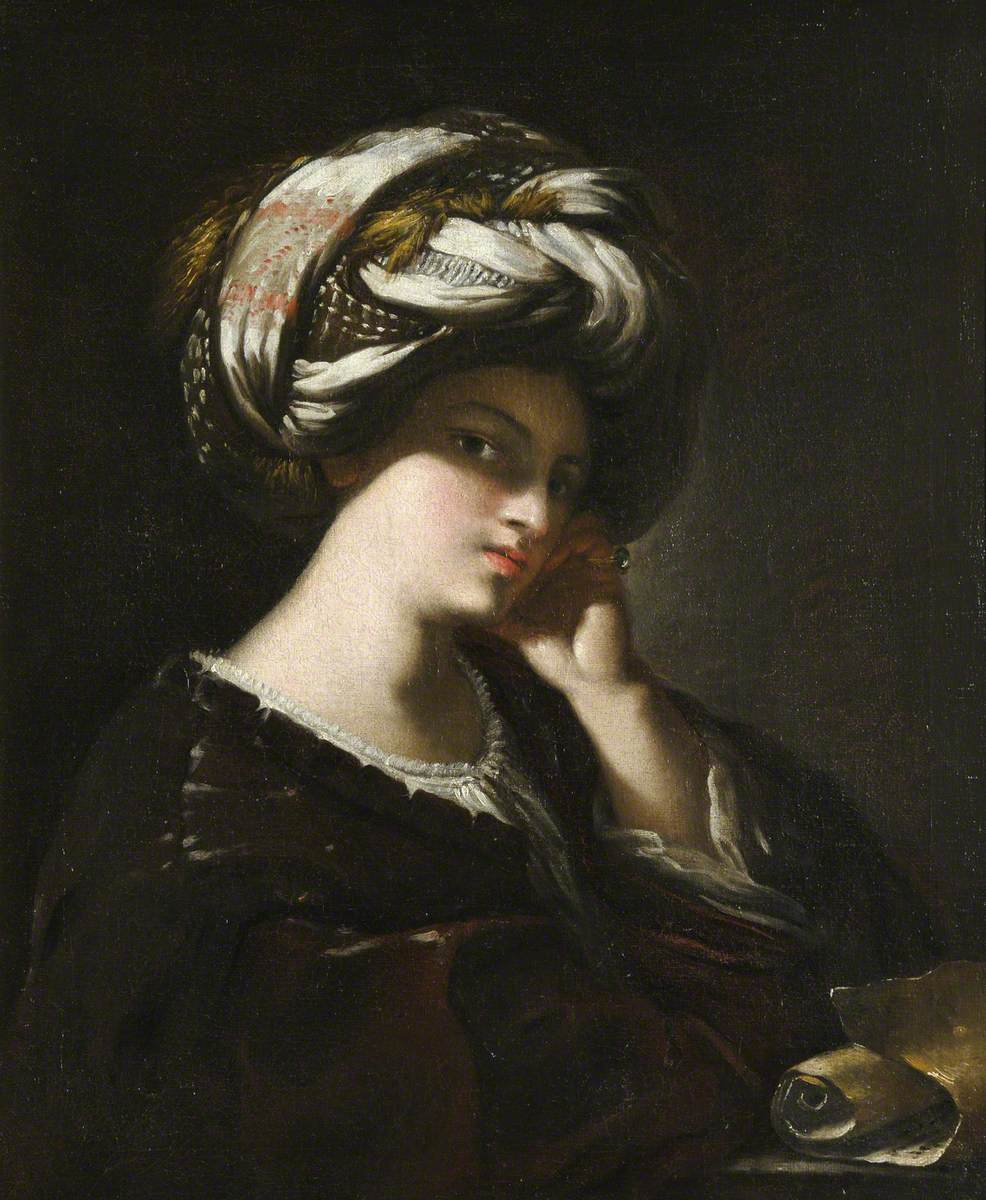
Girl with a Large Turban, Melford Hall, Long Melford

Many of Cairo's works are eccentric depictions of religious ecstasies; the saints appear liquefied and contorted by piety. He often caps them with exuberant, oriental turbans. He is sometimes compared with his Milanese contemporary, Carlo Francesco Nuvolone, also called Il Panfilo.

Cairo worked for a wide market and enjoyed handsome financial and social rewards. The sympathy he inspired in members of the House of Savoy played a major role in his career. In 1662, long after he had stopped working for them regularly, he asked Charles Emmanuel II for a dowry to enable his daughter to enter a convent. The day after his death his widow notified the House of Savoy.

The inventory of his collection drawn up two days after his death records an enormous stock, and it is possible that he also dealt in paintings. The contents are divided into two sections: the first, with 294 entries, records Cairo’s own pictures and those by other artists, including Rubens, van Dyck, Guido Reni, Paris Bordone, Giulio Cesare Procaccini and Salvator Rosa; the second part lists 129 abbozzi (sketches) by Cairo, some on panel. Some collectors, such as the churchman Cesare Biandrate, seem to have specialized in Cairo’s work; others commissioned copies of his paintings not long after his death. Such references offer brief glimpses of his position in the rich, complex and fluid Seicento art market.

== Gallery ==
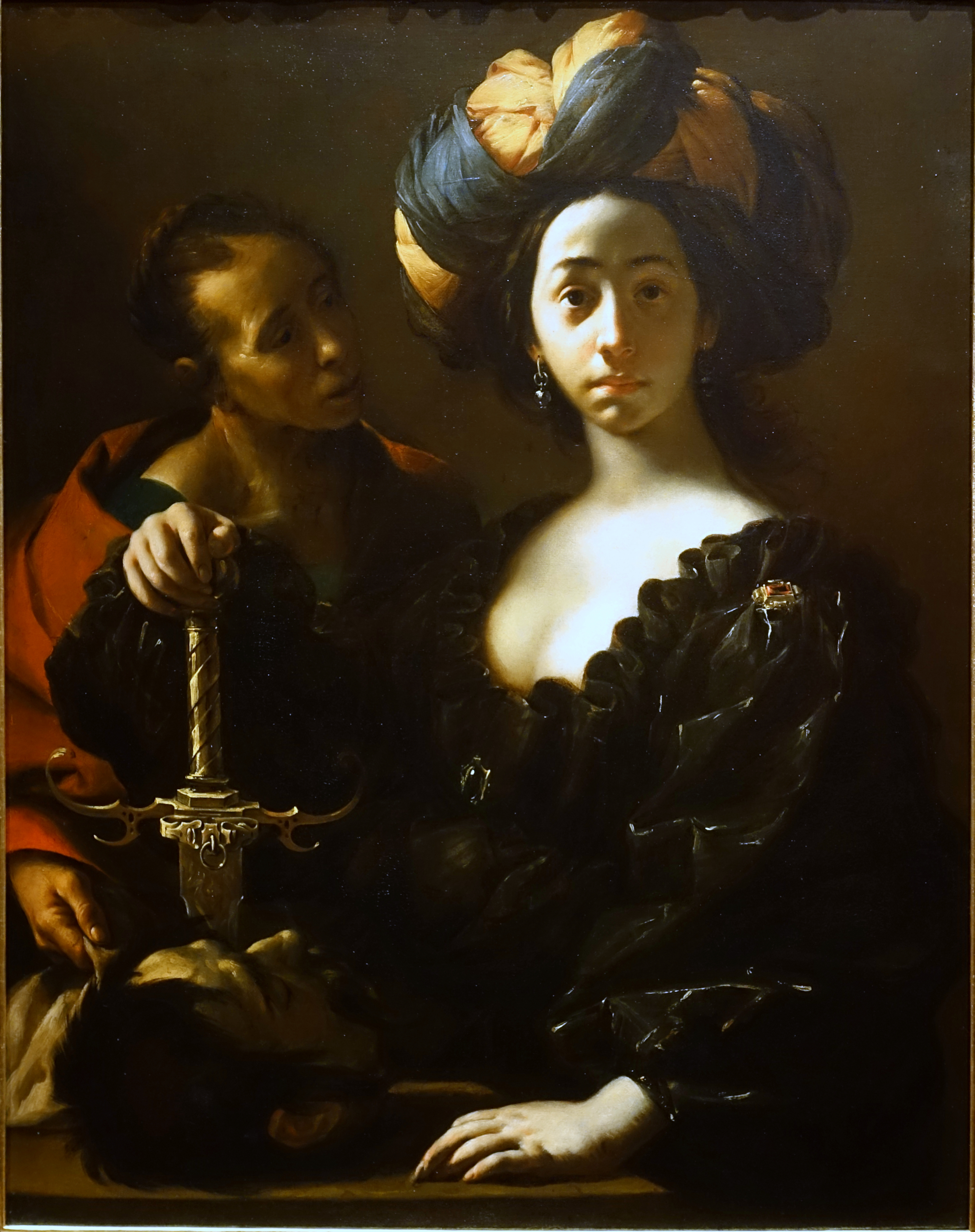
Judith with the Head of Holofernes, oil on canvas, John and Mable Ringling Museum of Art, Sarasota, FL

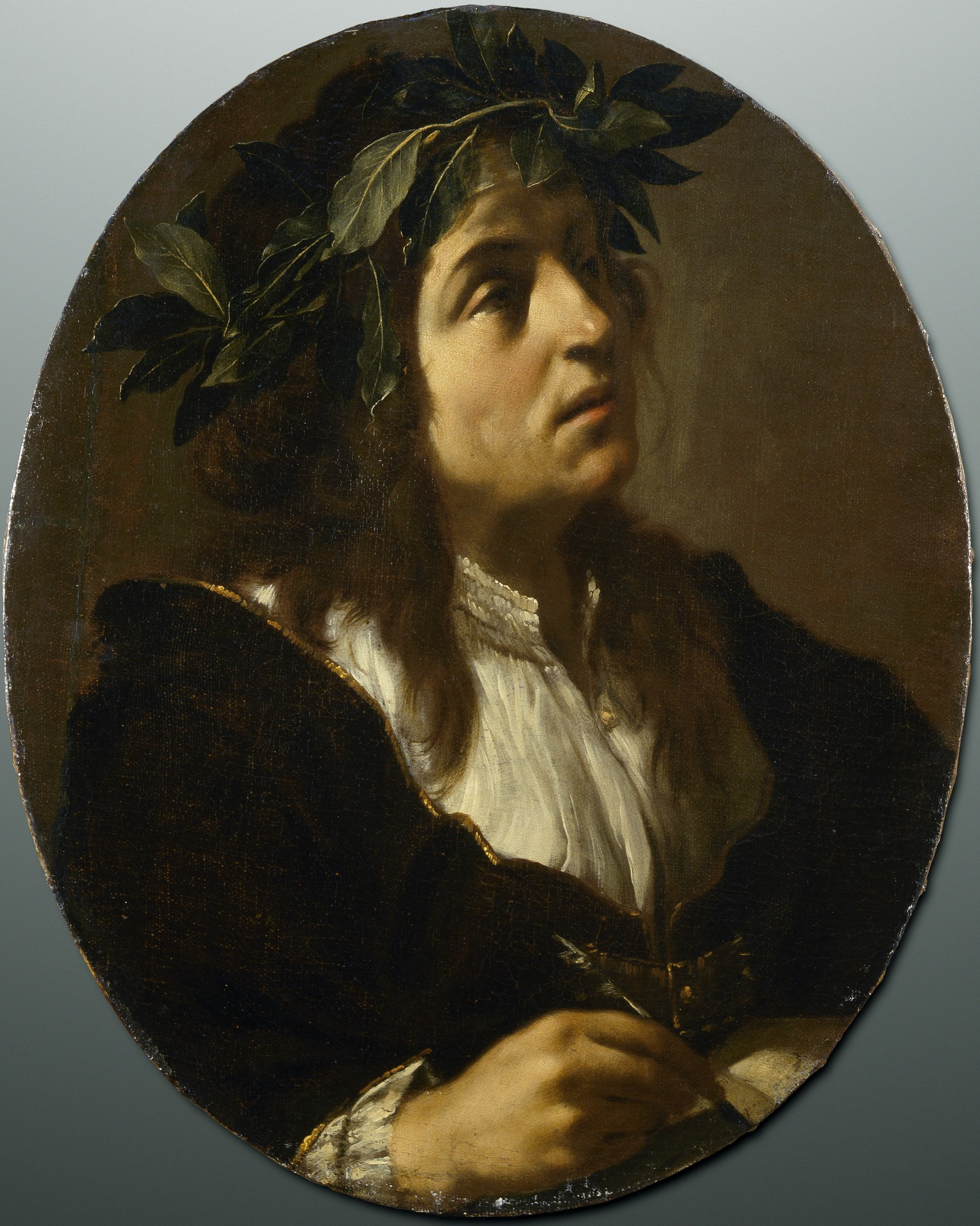
Portrait of a Poet, oil on canvas, Hermitage Museum, Saint Petersburg

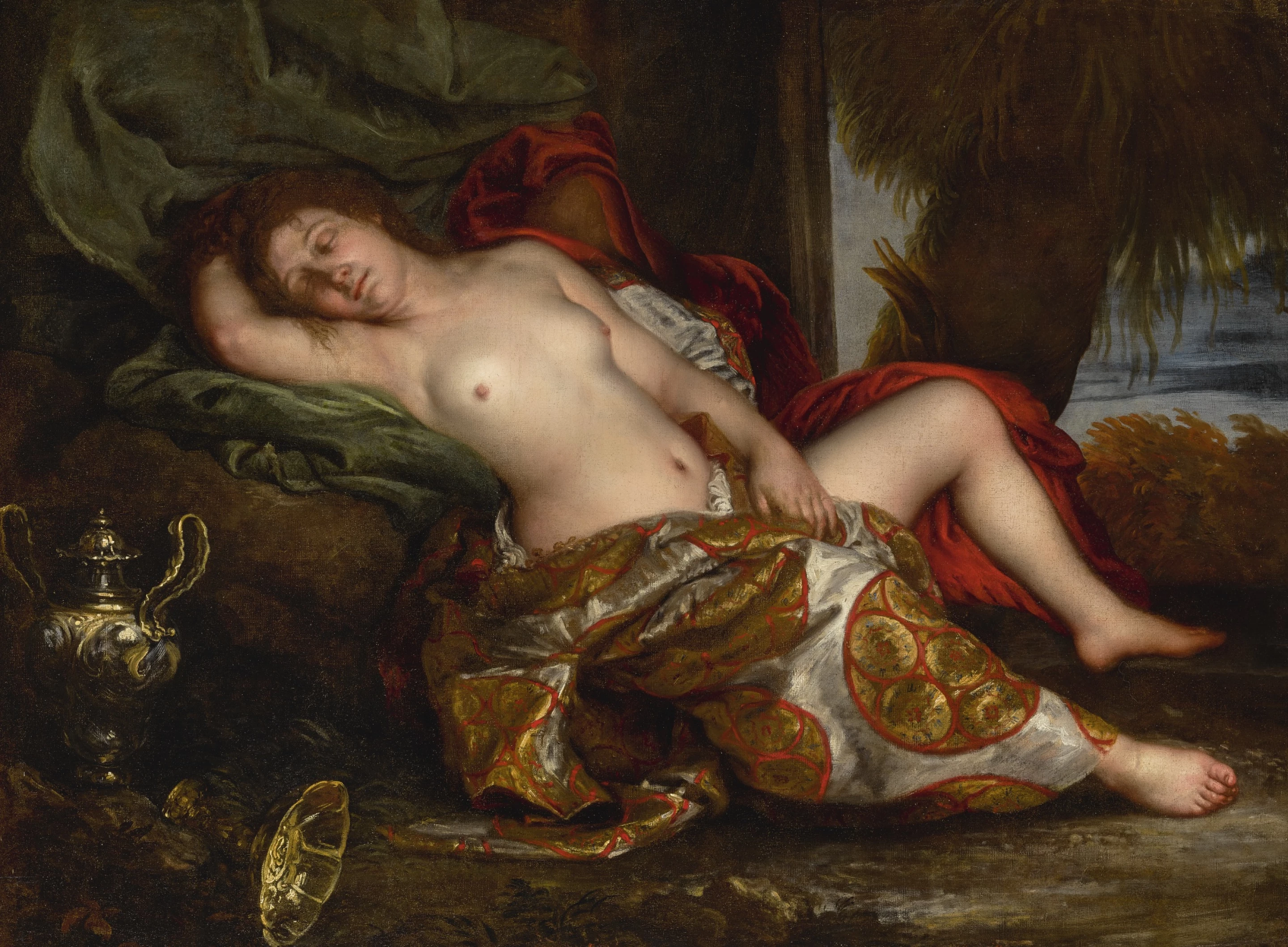
Reclining nude, oil on canvas, priv. col.

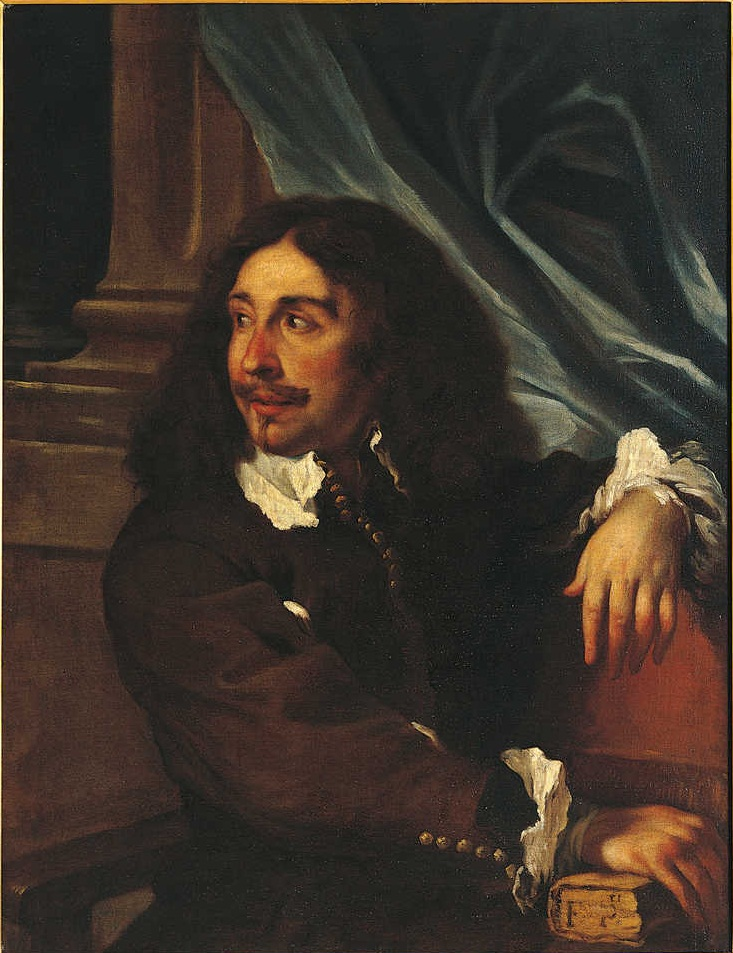
Portrait of Luigi Pellegrini Scaramuccia, oil on canvas, Pinacoteca di Brera, Milan

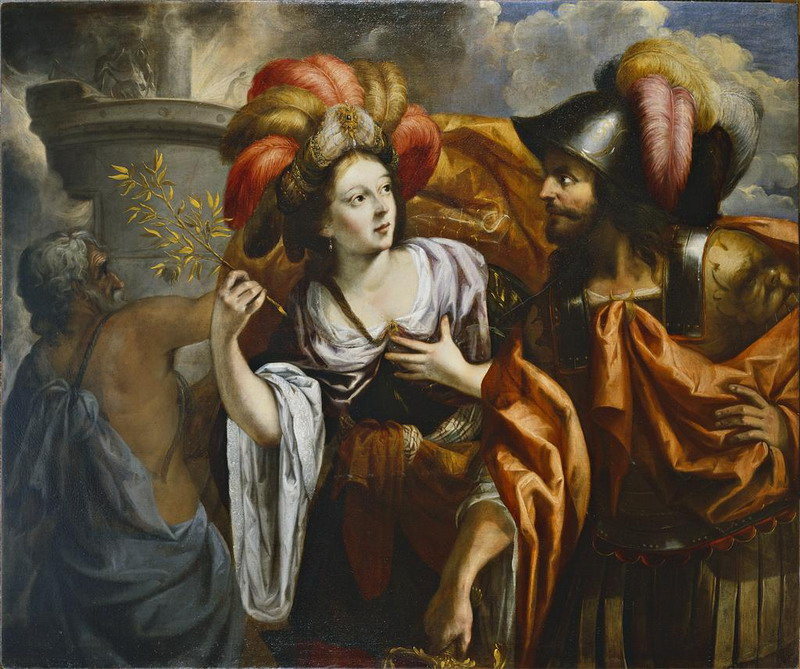
Aeneas and the Cumaean Sibyl, oil on canvas, priv. col.

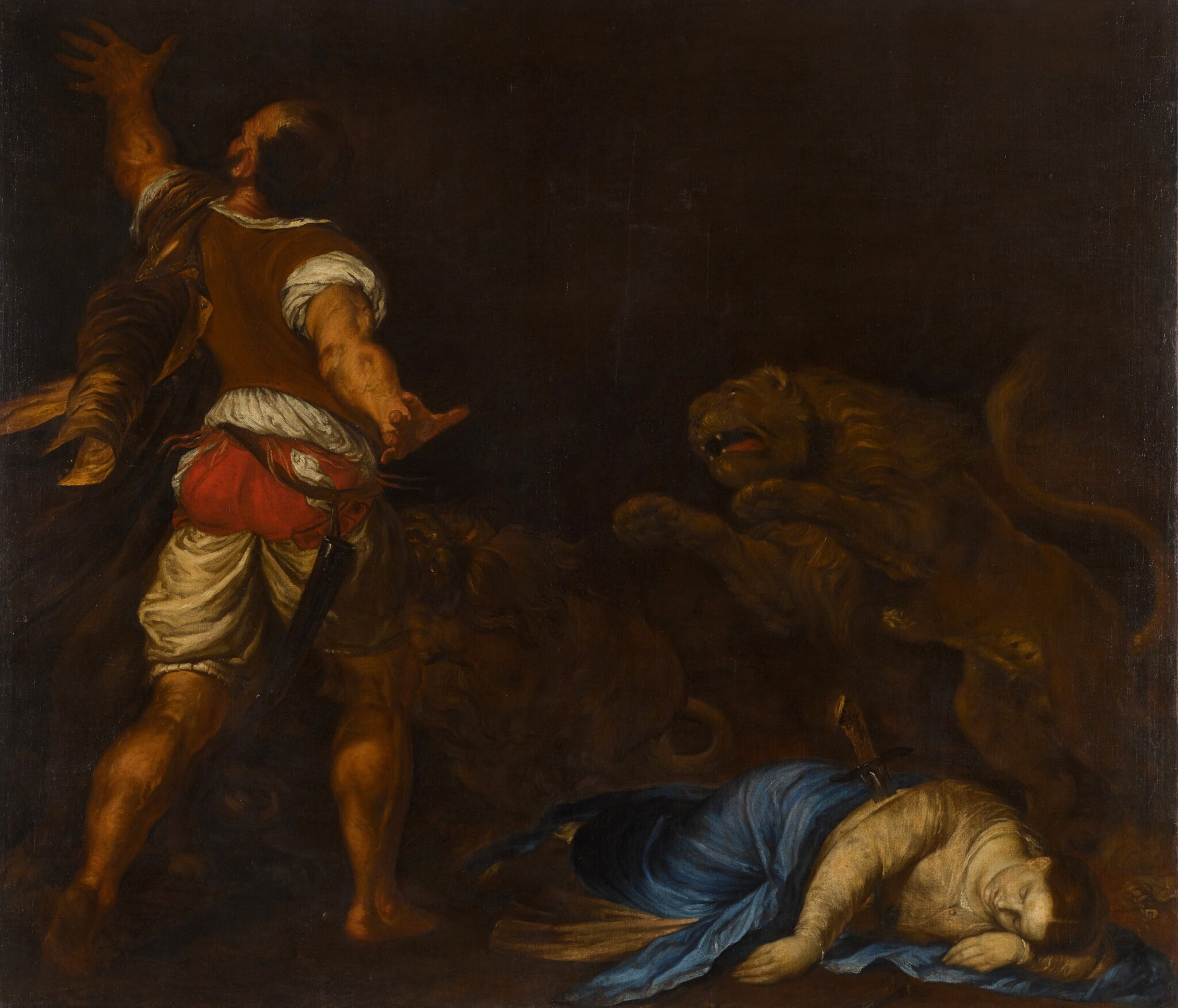
The Martyrdom of Saint Euphemia, oil on canvas, priv. col.

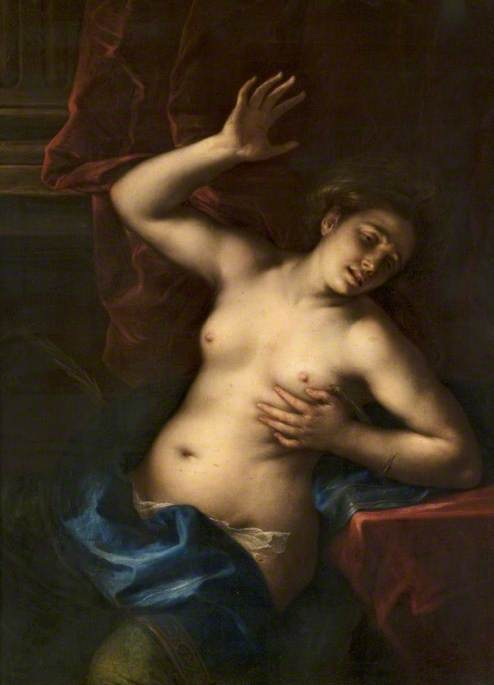
The Death of Cleopatra, oil on canvas, Glasgow Museums Resource Centre, Glasgow

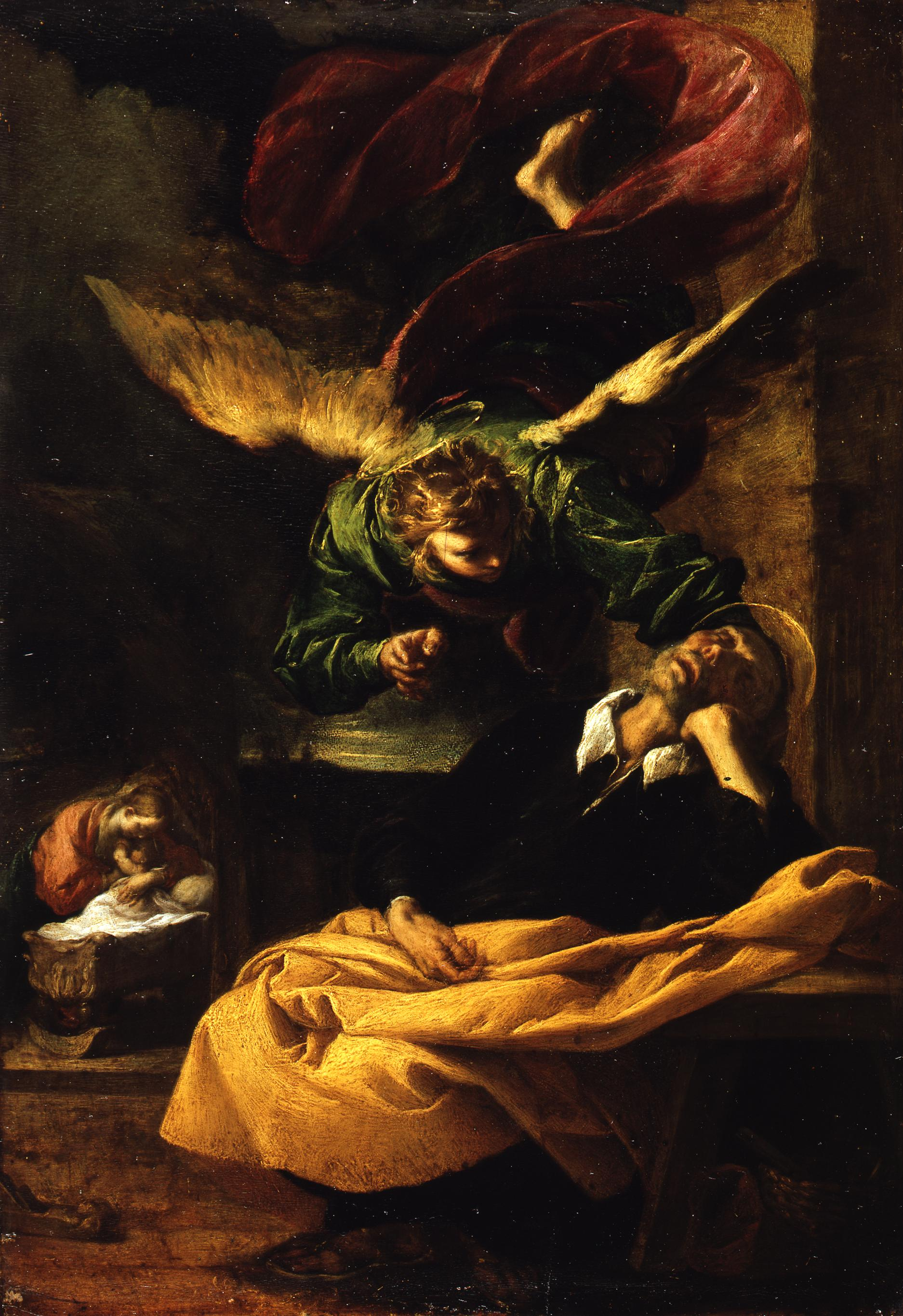
Joseph's Dream, oil on canvas, Gemäldegalerie, Berlin

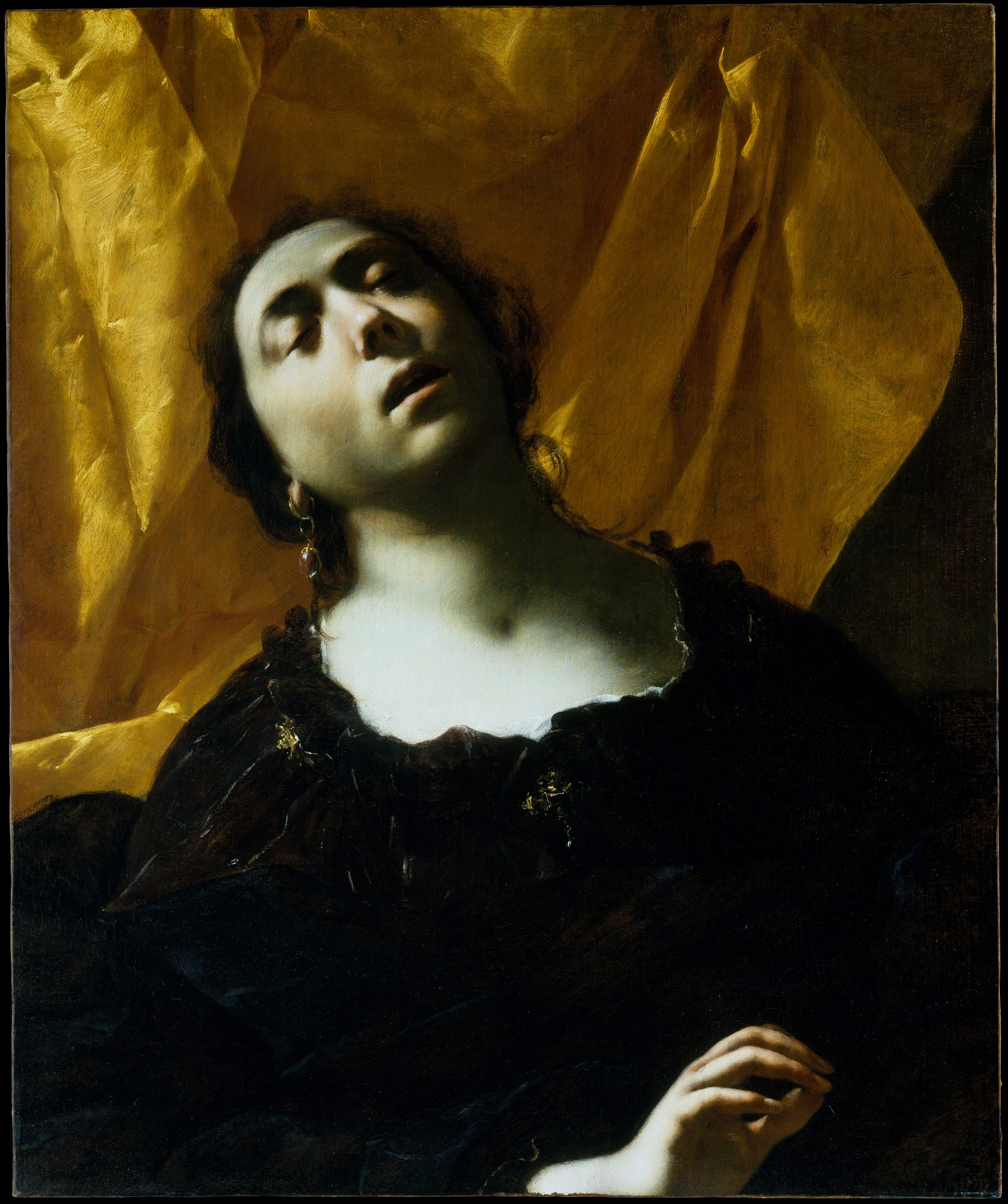
Herodias, oil on canvas, Metropolitan Museum of Art, New York

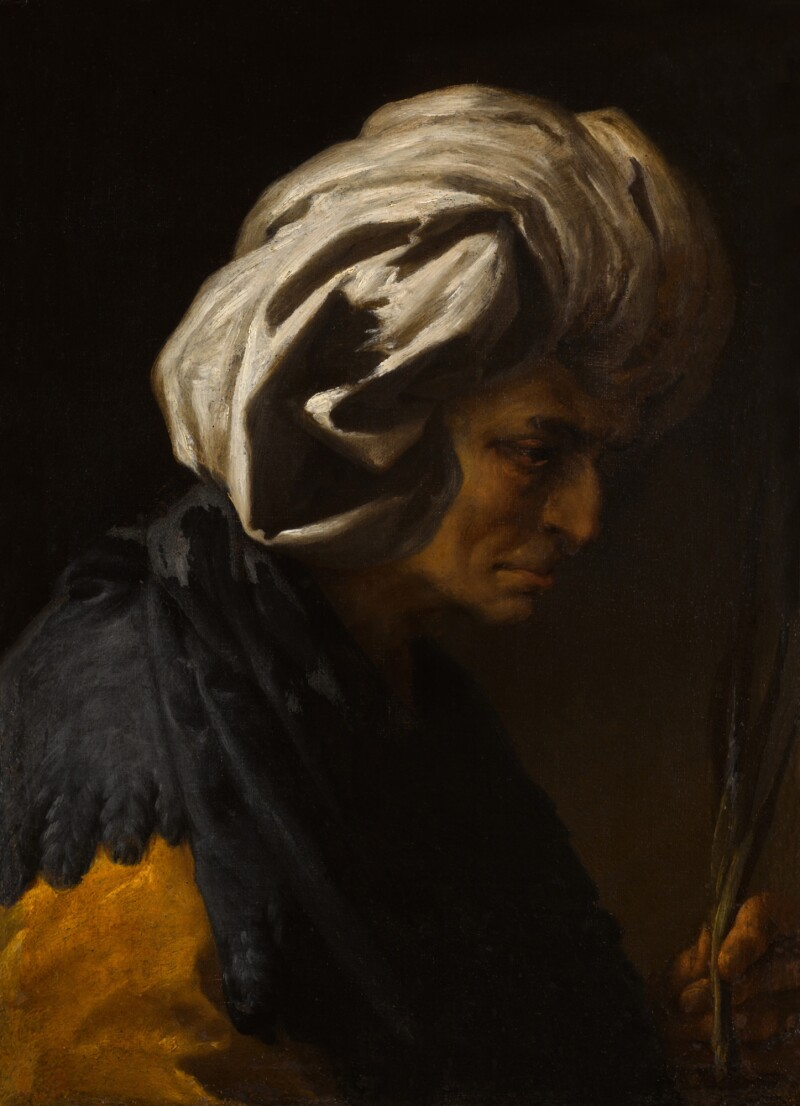
An old woman in a white turban and feathered cape, oil on canvas, priv. col.

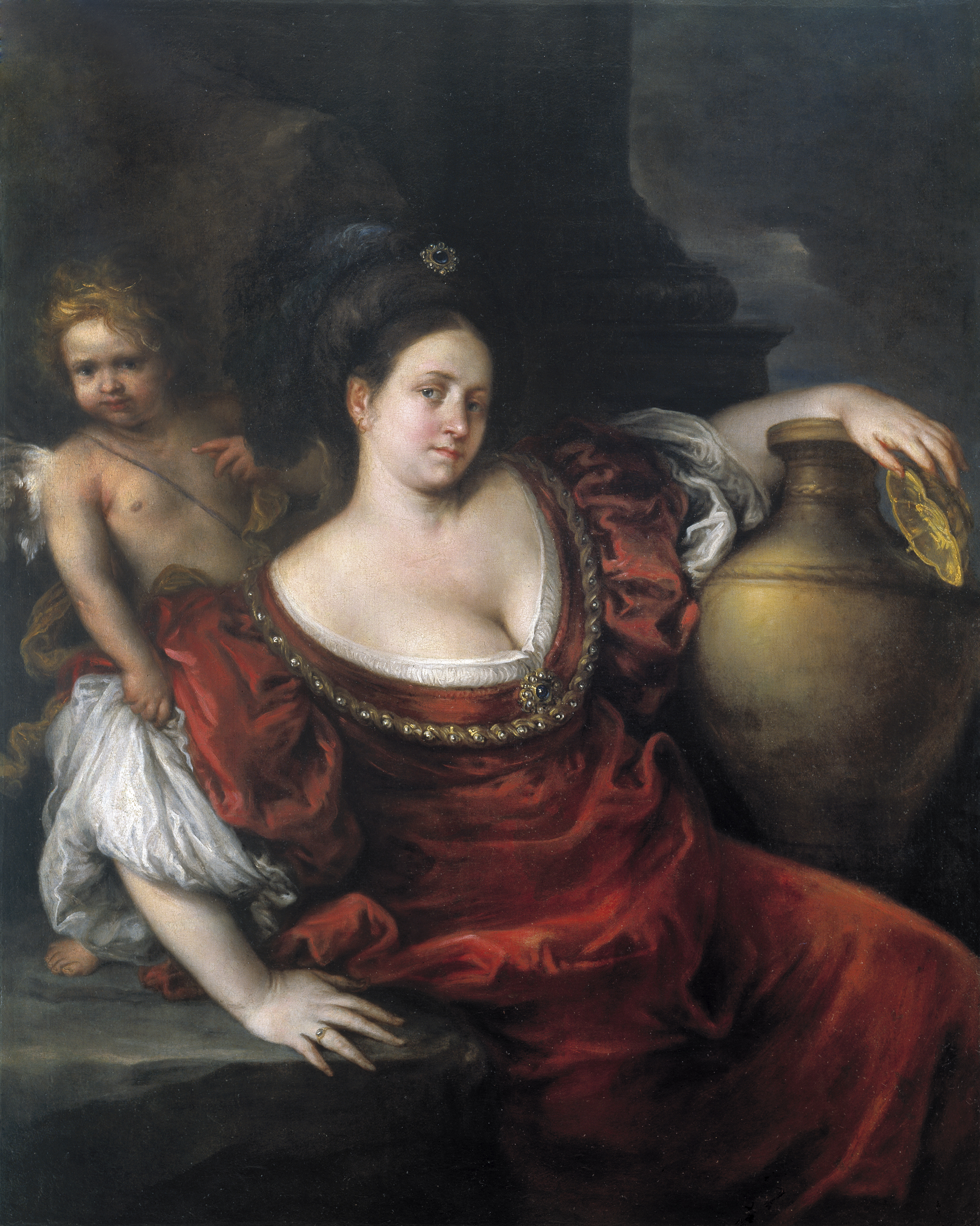
Artemisia II of Caria with the urn containing the ashes of her husband Mausolus, oil on canvas, priv. col.

== Sources ==
- Bryan, Michael (1886). Robert Edmund Graves (ed.). Dictionary of Painters and Engravers, Biographical and Critical. Vol. I: A-K. London: George Bell and Sons. p. 208.
- Matalon, Stella (1930). "Francesco del Cairo". Rivista d'arte. 12: 497–532.
- Morassi, Antonio (1930). "CAIRO, Francesco del". Enciclopedia Italiana. Rome: Istituto dell'Enciclopedia Italiana.
- Wittkower, Rudolf (1993). Pelican History of Art: Art and Architecture Italy, 1600-1750. 1980. Penguin Books Ltd. p. 339.
