= Savani =

Savani is a surname. Notable people with the surname include:

- Cristian Savani (born 1982), Italian volleyball player
- Francesco Savani (1723–1772), Italian painter
- Mathur Savani (born 1963), Indian businessman and social worker
