= Pietro Avogadro =

Italian painter

Frescos by Pietro Marone and Pietro Avogadro in the Sant'Agata church of Brescia

Pietro Avogadro (died c. 1730) was an Italian painter of the Rococo period. He was born in Brescia and trained with Pompeo Ghiti. He is mentioned by the biographer Luigi Lanzi. Among his works are a Martyrdom of Saints Crispin for the church of San Giuseppe in Brescia. He is also sometimes referred to as Bresciano Avogadro.
