= Sant'Apollonia Altarpiece =

Altarpiece by Pietro Scalvini

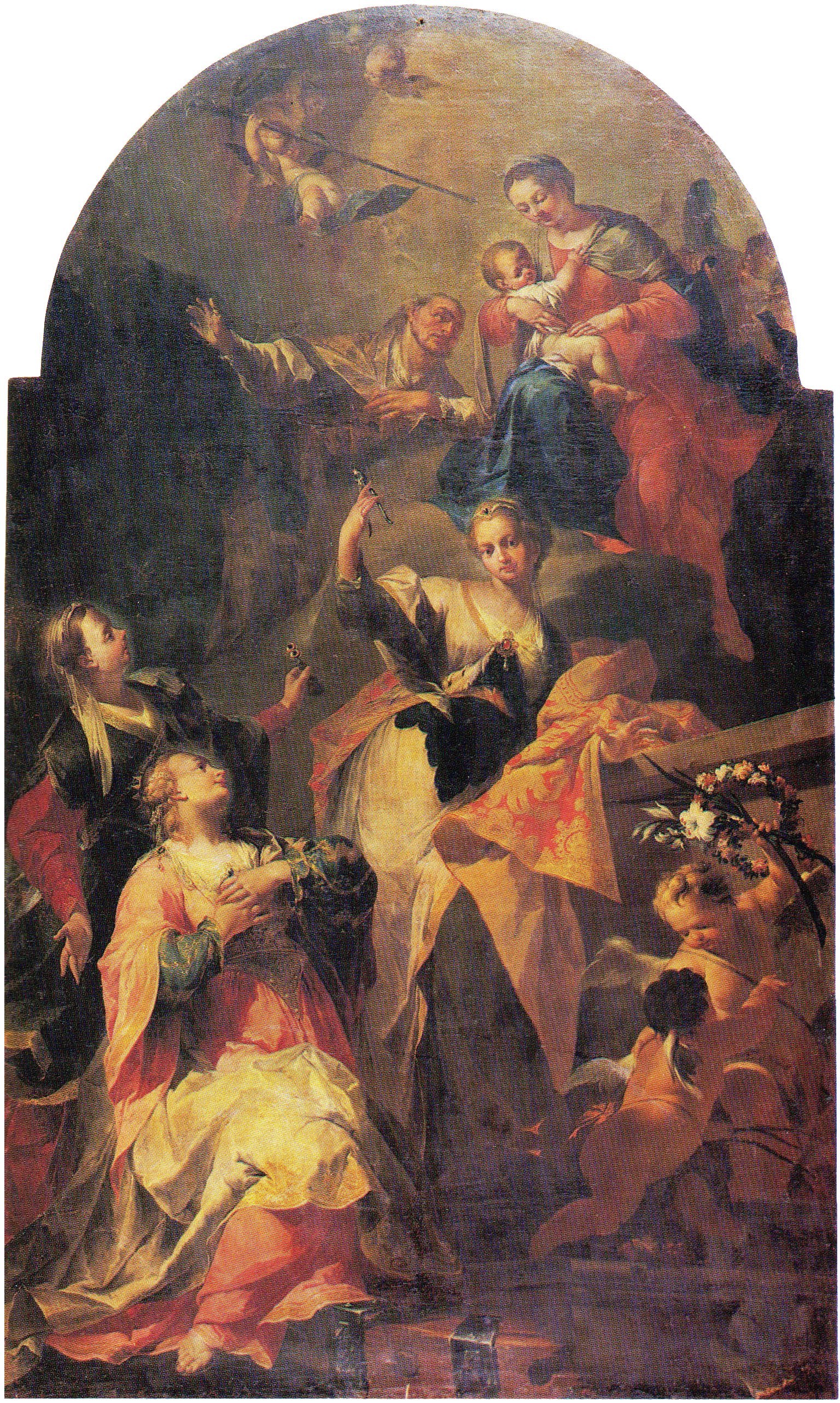

Sant'Apollonia Altarpiece is a 1761 oil on canvas painting by Pietro Scalvini, still on its original site on a side altar in the church of San Giuseppe in Brescia. Its central figures are Saint Apollonia adoring the Madonna and Child, with Catherine of Alexandria and Saint Lucy at lower left and cherubs holding the palms and crowns of martyrdom at lower right.

A group of "devoted boys" requested an altar dedicated to Apollonia in the church on 12 April 1760 and one was granted them by father Guardiano Fortunato. They commissioned a painting for it. It escaped the art confiscations under the Republic of Brescia and is still in its original location.
