= Giovanni Battista Discepoli =

Italian painter

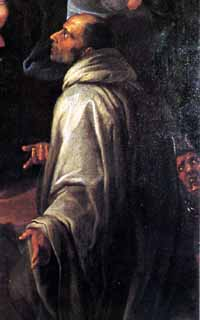
Giovanni Battista Discepoli, Saint Bernard of Menthon (detail)

Giovanni Battista Discepoli (1590–1660), also called "Lo Zoppo di Lugano" from his being a cripple, was a Swiss-Italian painter of the Baroque period, active mainly in Milan.

Born in Lugano, Switzerland, he was a pupil of the painter Camillo Procaccini. In Milan, he painted a Purgatory for the church of San Carlo, and an Adoration of the Magi originally painted for San Marcello is now in the Brera Gallery. Lugano also has some of his works; in the church of Santa Teresa at Como is a picture of that Saint. One of his pupils was Pompeo Ghiti from Brescia.
