= Giulio Coralli =

Italian painter (born 1641)

Giulio Coralli Giulio Coralli (born 1641) was an Italian painter of the Baroque period, active in Emilia-Romagna. He was a pupil, first of Guercino, and later in Milan, of Francesco Cairo. He was known for his portraits.
