= San Giuseppe, Brescia =

Church in Brescia, Italy

Coordinates: 45.5407°N 10.2204°E

Façade of the church.

San Giuseppe is a complex of religious buildings in central Brescia, Lombardy, northern Italy. It includes a church and a monastery.

== History ==
In 1515, the Observant Friars Minor (Franciscans) had acquired this property in the centre of Brescia, and by 1520 had built a convent at the site. There had been a monastery of San Francesco in the then outskirts of the city. Construction of the church began in 1519 and was generally complete by 1541. A third cloister for the monastery was completed in 1610.

In 1797, the monasteries were suppressed, but the monastery of San Giuseppe was allowed to continue to operate. In 1810 the order was abolished in the region, and the convent expropriated. The church remained active. It was however suppressed from 1866 to 1896. In 1973 one of the cloisters was provided to the Diocese to create a museum.

The church, whose façade is one of the few examples of Renaissance architecture in the quarter, houses frescoes and decoration including fourteen Stations of the Cross of (Via Crucis) (1713) by Giovanni Antonio Capello and the Sant'Apollonia Altarpiece by Scalvini (1761). The church houses the tombs of Gasparo da Salò, one of the inventors of the modern violin and Benedetto Marcello, a Baroque musician. The organs in the church is among the oldest in Lombardy.
