= Giovanni Antonio Capello =

Italian painter (1699–1741)

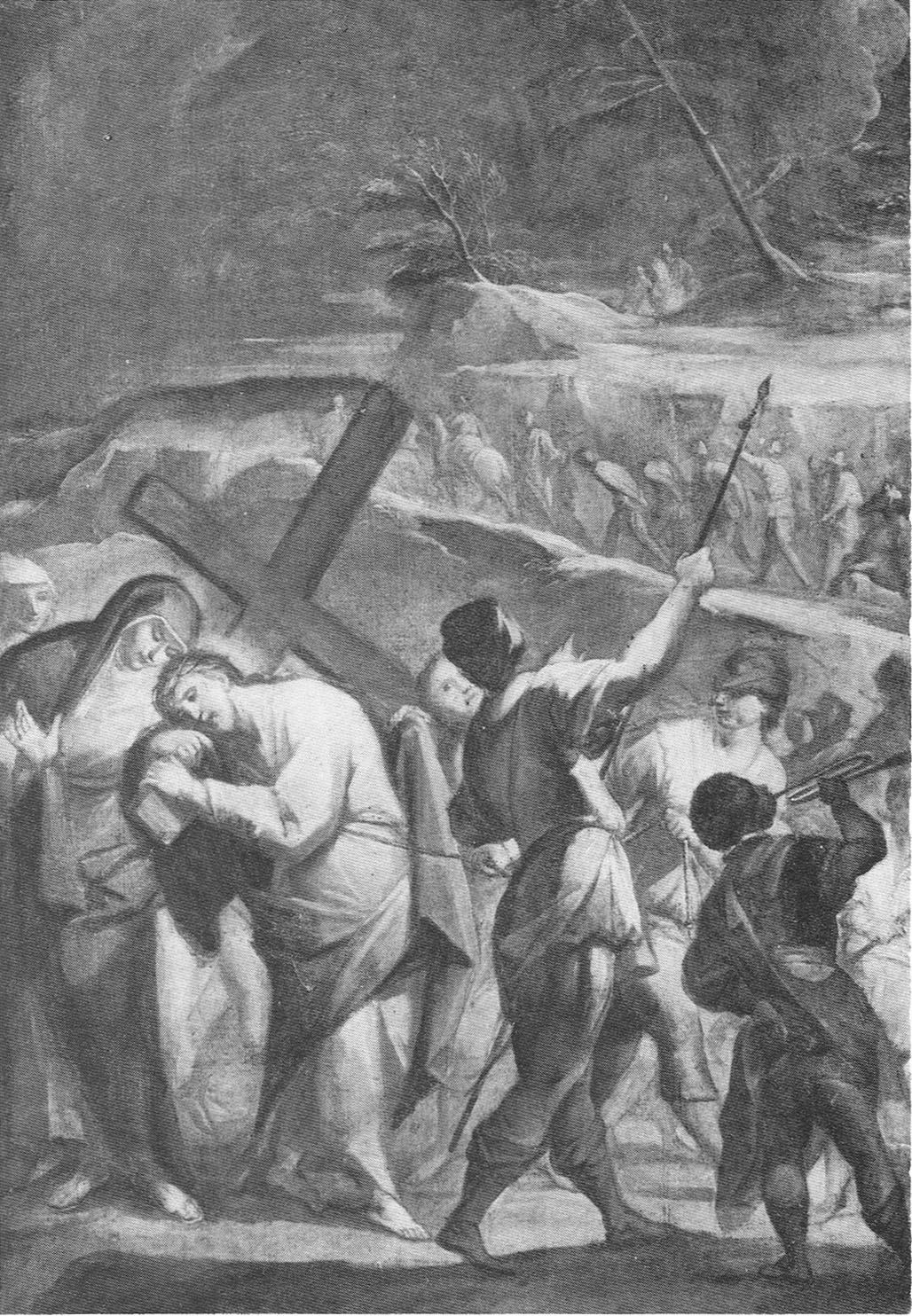
Jesus meets his mother while carrying the Cross, 1713

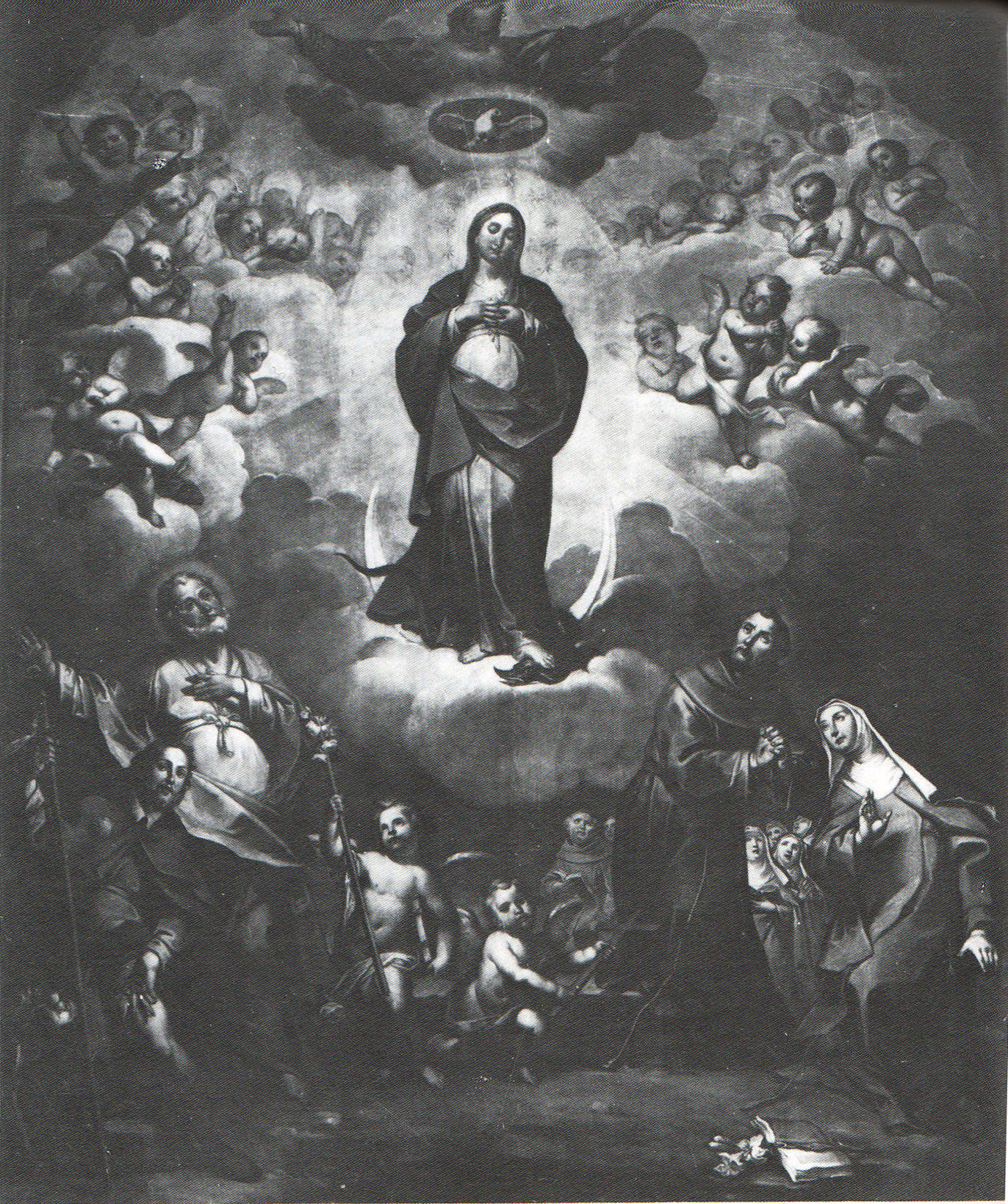
Madonna, 1719

Giovanni Antonio Capello (1699, in Brescia – 1741) was an Italian painter of the late-Baroque period, active mainly in Brescia.

He was a pupil of the painters Pompeo Ghitti (1631–1703), later Lorenzo Pasinelli in Bologna, and finally in Rome with Giovanni Battista Gaulli. Some of his paintings recall the style of Pietro Testa.
