= Francesco Savani =

Italian painter (1723–1772)

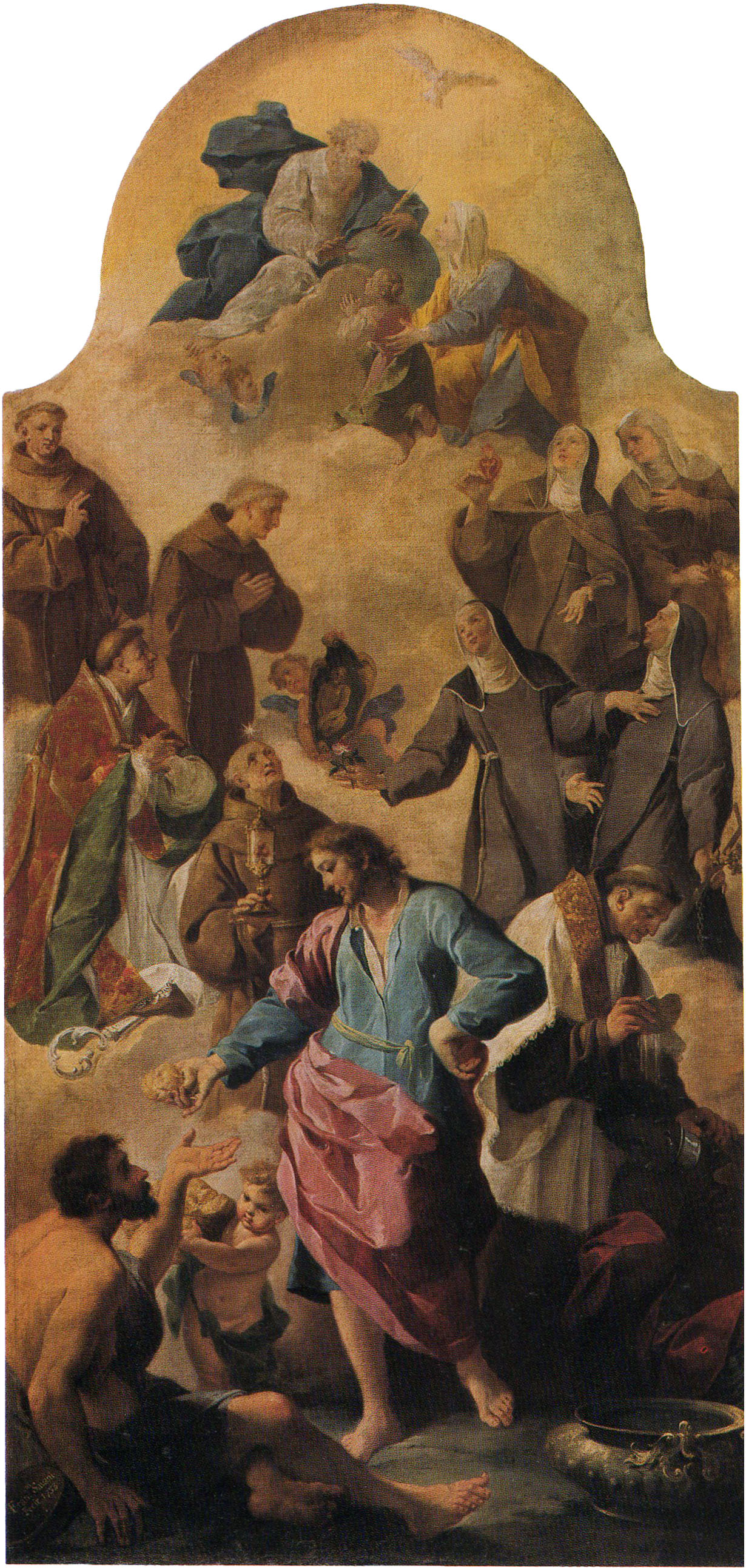
Pala dei Fornai, Chiesa di San Giuseppe (Brescia)

Francesco Savani (1723 – 4 May 1772) Was an Italian quadratura painter of the Rococo period. He was born in Brescia, Republic of Venice, and active mainly there. When his father sent him to study letters and sciences at a Jesuit school, he entertained himself by drawing portraits of his teachers. His first art training was with Brescian painter Angelo Paglia. He then studied with Francesco Monti, who had come from Bologna to paint in the Chiesa della Pace. Savani's style ultimately came to reflect that of Giambattista Pittoni. Savani's works at Coccaglio were admired by Tiepolo. Savani died impoverished, said to have been brought to ruin by a prostitute.
