= Pietro Scalvini =

Italian painter

Pietro Scalvini (1718–1792) was an Italian painter of the late-Baroque and Neoclassic period, active in Brescia. He was inspired by Tiepolo and active in fresco painting of churches. His works include Sant'Apollonia Altarpiece.

== Gallery ==
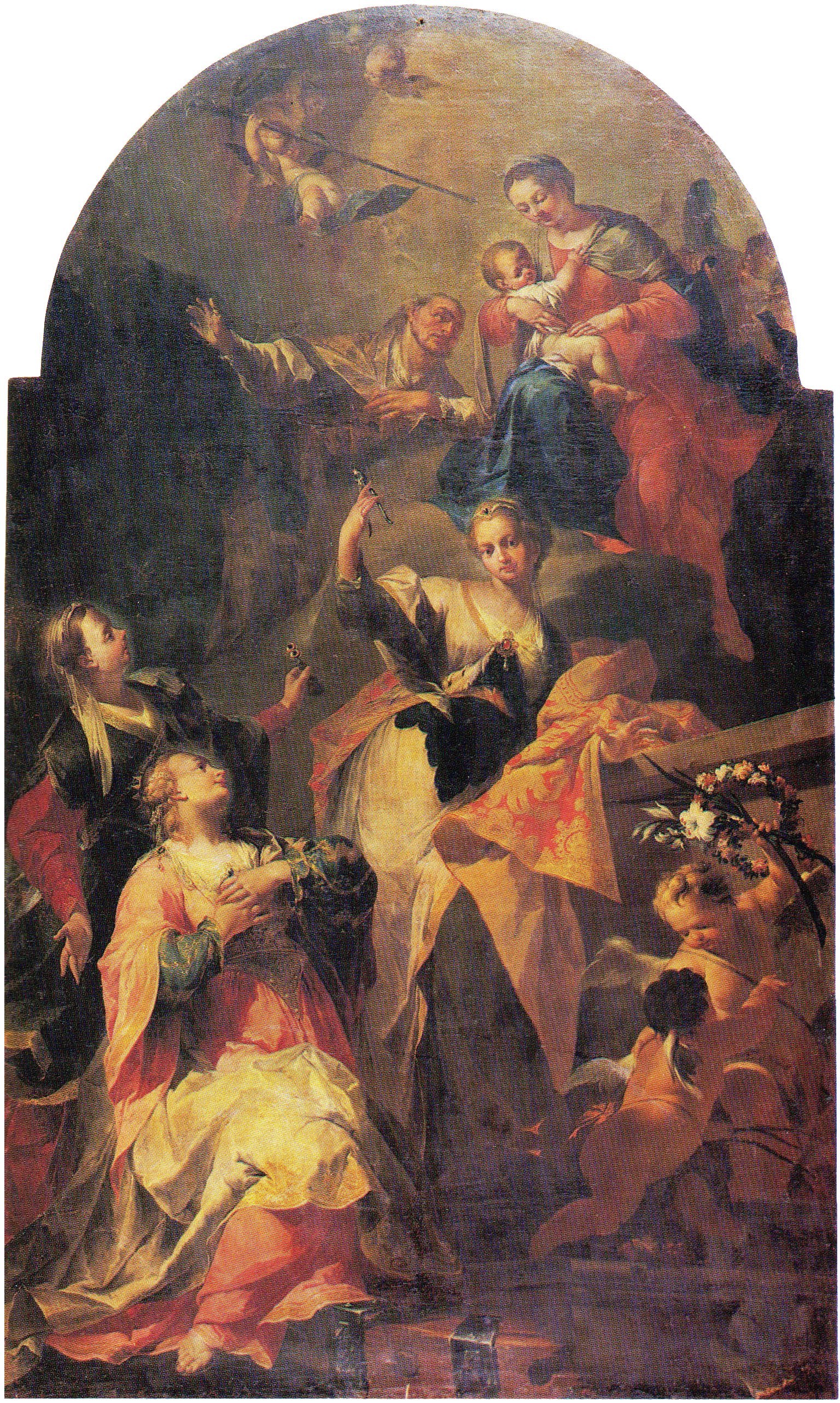
Altarpiece with Madonna and Child and Saints

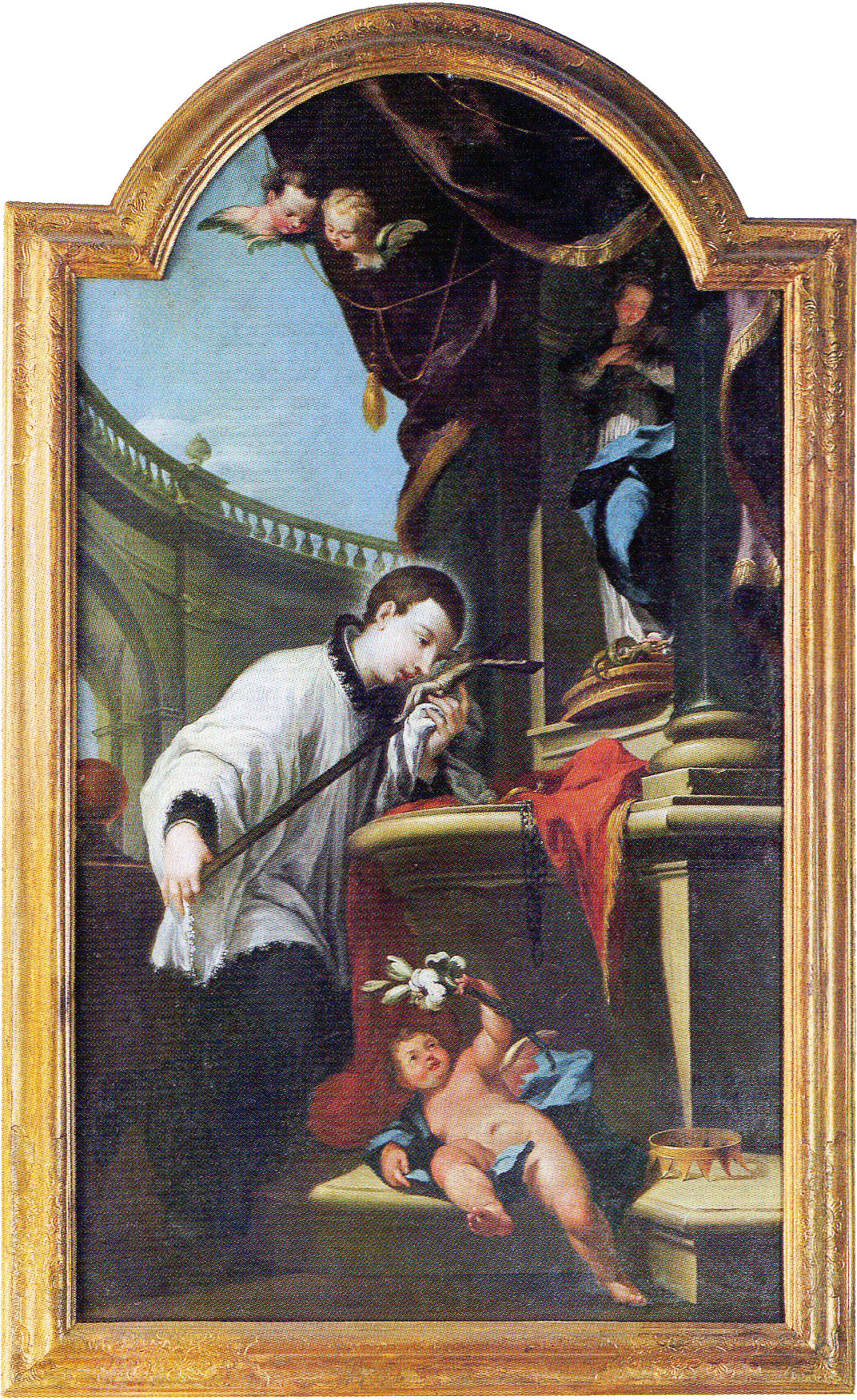
Saint Aloysius de Gonzaga Adores the Cross

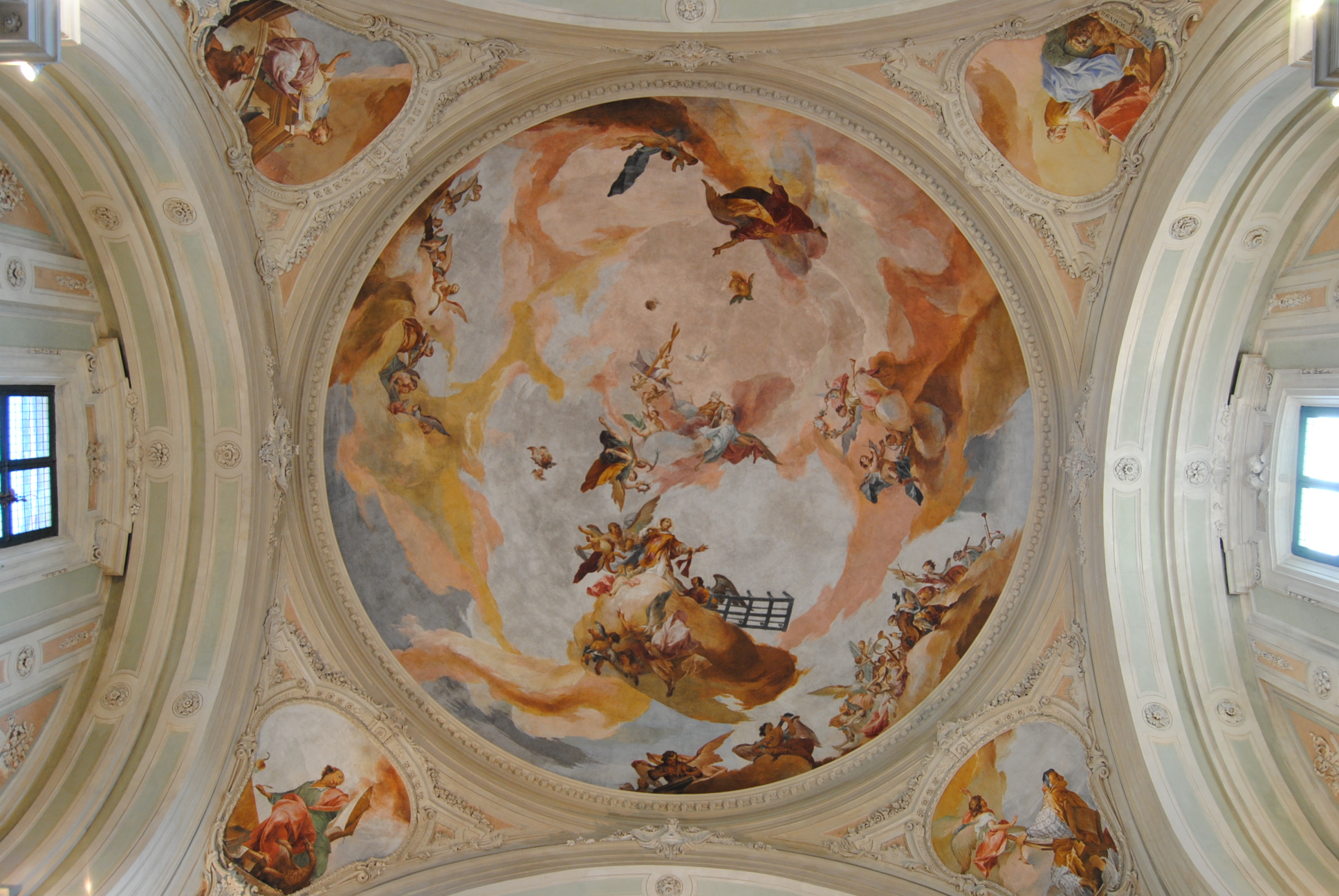
Apotheosis of San Lorenzo Martire, central dome, 1786, Church of San Lorenzo Martire, Nuvolera.

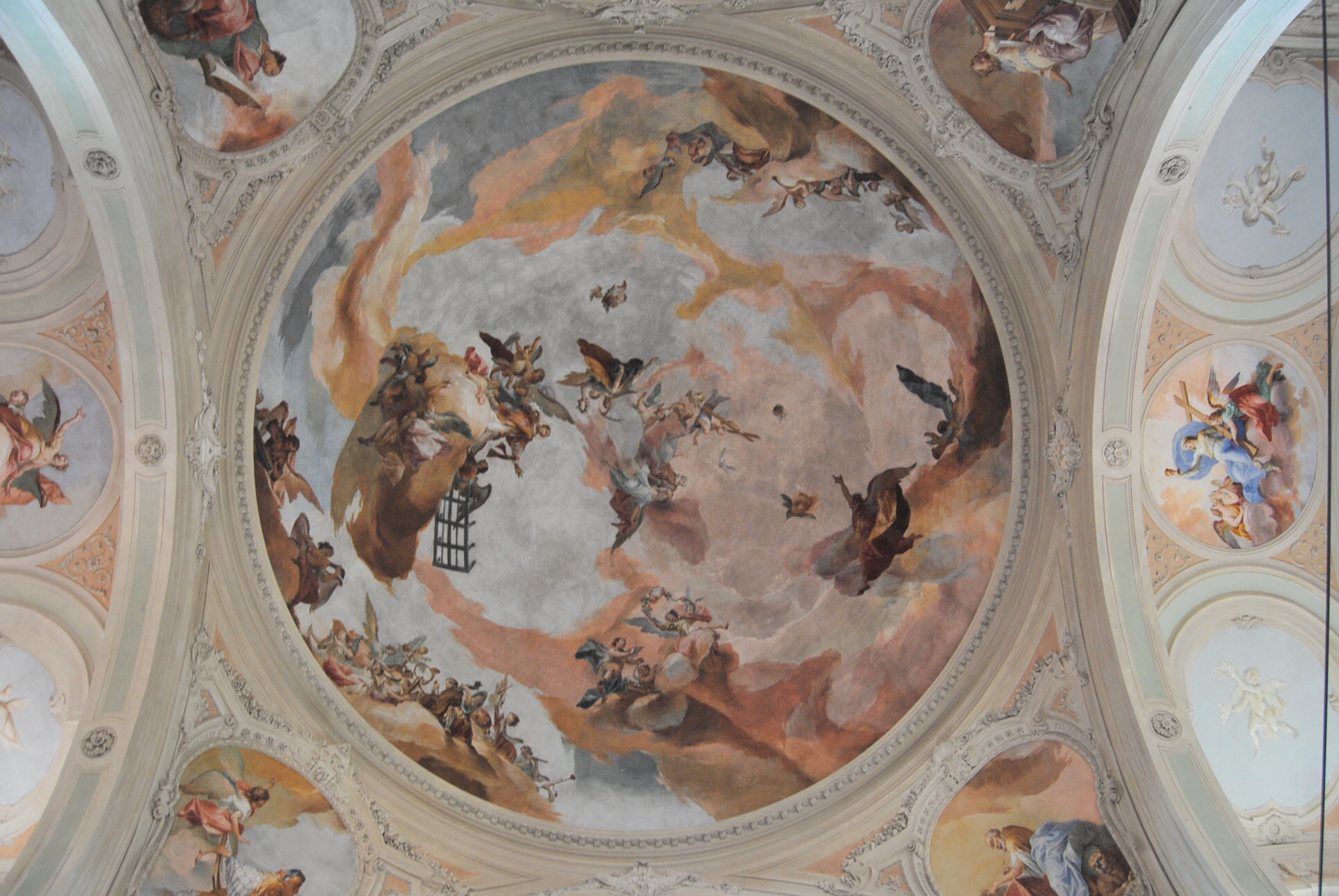
Apoteosi di San Lorenzo Martire

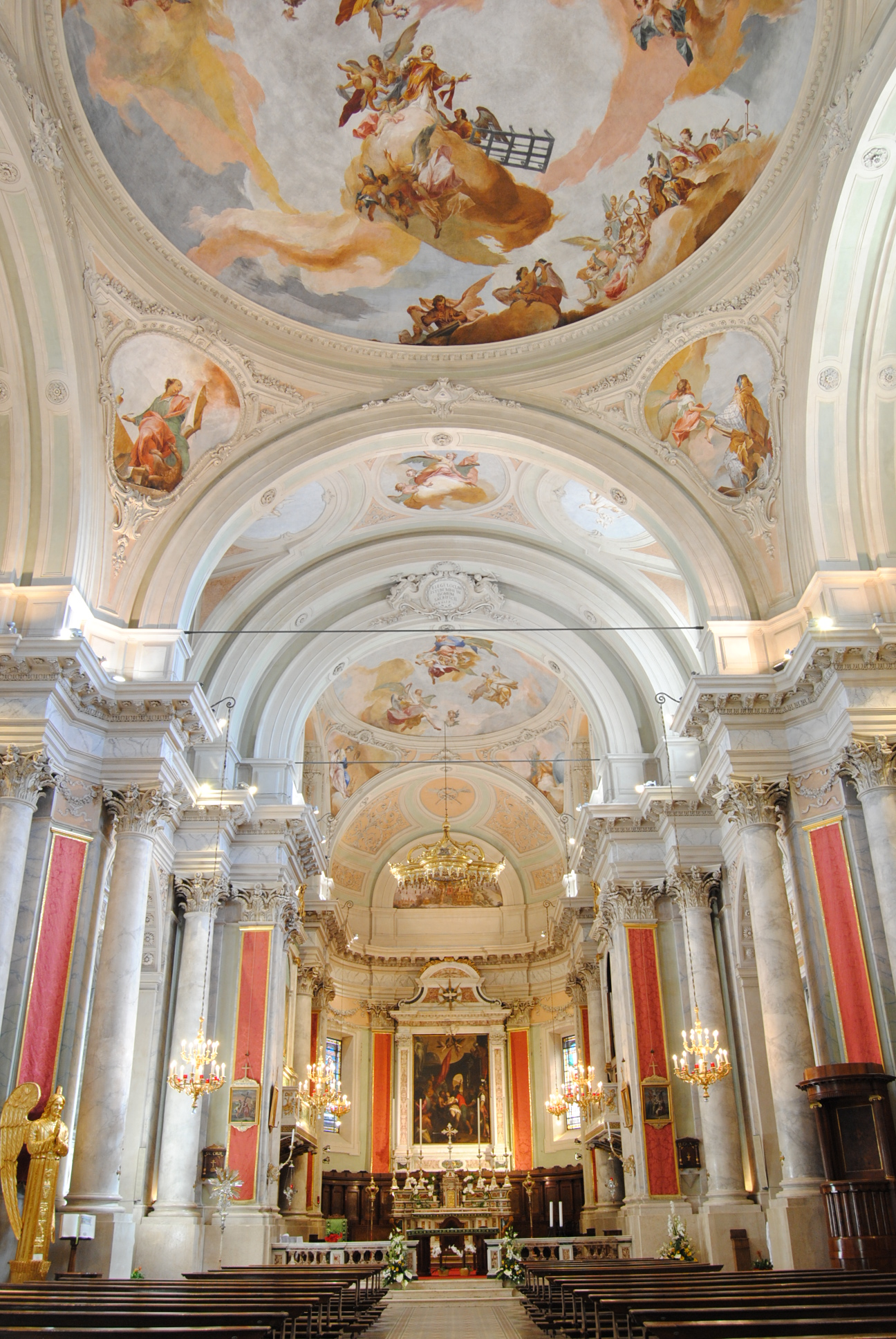
Parish Church of San Lorenzo Martire, frescos by Pietro Scalvini.
