= Cantalamessa =

Cantalamessa is an Italian surname. Notable people with the surname include:

- Giulio Cantalamessa (1846–1924), Italian painter and art critic
- Raniero Cantalamessa (born 1934), Franciscan priest and theologian
