= Tobias and the Angel (Savoldo) =

c. 1527 painting by Giovanni Girolamo Savoldo

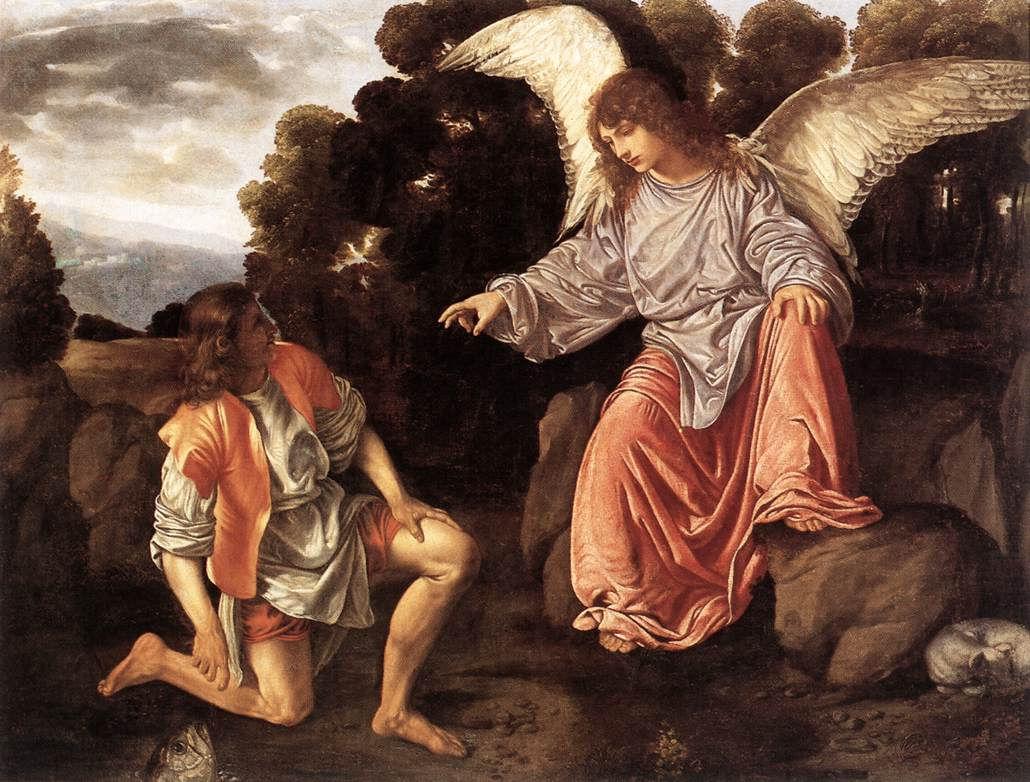
- Artist: Girolamo Savoldo
- Year: c. 1527
- Medium: oil on canvas
- Dimensions: 96 cm × 126 cm (38 in × 50 in)
- Location: Galleria Borghese; Rome

Tobias and the Angel is an oil on canvas painting by Giovanni Girolamo Savoldo, created c. 1527. It is held in the Galleria Borghese, in Rome, since 1910. The Galleria's director Giulio Cantalamessa saw the work in a private house in Tivoli and corrected its misattribution to Titian. It hangs in the Sala dell Aurora.

== Description ==
According to the Bible, the archangel Raphael helped the young Tobias during a dangerous journey, until he obtained the antidote to cure his father's blindness, from the entrails of a fish that had tried to bite him while crossing a river. Savoldo represents the moment in which the angel tells the young man to catch the fish, while the little dog that accompanied them appears curled up at the bottom right.

The artist concentrated on some details, such as the treatment of the drapery with silvery flashes, most evident in the angel's dress, that appears as if wet, and in the details derived from a naturalistic observation, such as the light that pierces the foliage, or the particular atmospheric sensitivity of the clouds that veil the landscape in the distance. The sentimentality, on the other hand, refers to Giorgione's calm pastoral tones. Physically, the angel with long hair and delicate features closely resembles the one depicted by Titian in the Averoldi Polyptych, painted a few years earlier for a church in Brescia.

In the kneeling young man, the artist placed all that immediate realism typical of the Brescia Renaissance masters, of which he was a member, particularly in the flesh, very alive and sanguine, or in the natural pose that overshadows the face.

Moreover, the representation of this scene is singular, because it does not fit into the pictorial tradition which most often depicts Tobias and the Angel walking. Here it is a pause and Tobias, instead of being represented by a young teenager, is a young man full of energy.
