= Giovanni Girolamo Savoldo =

Italian painter (c. 1480–1485 – 1548)

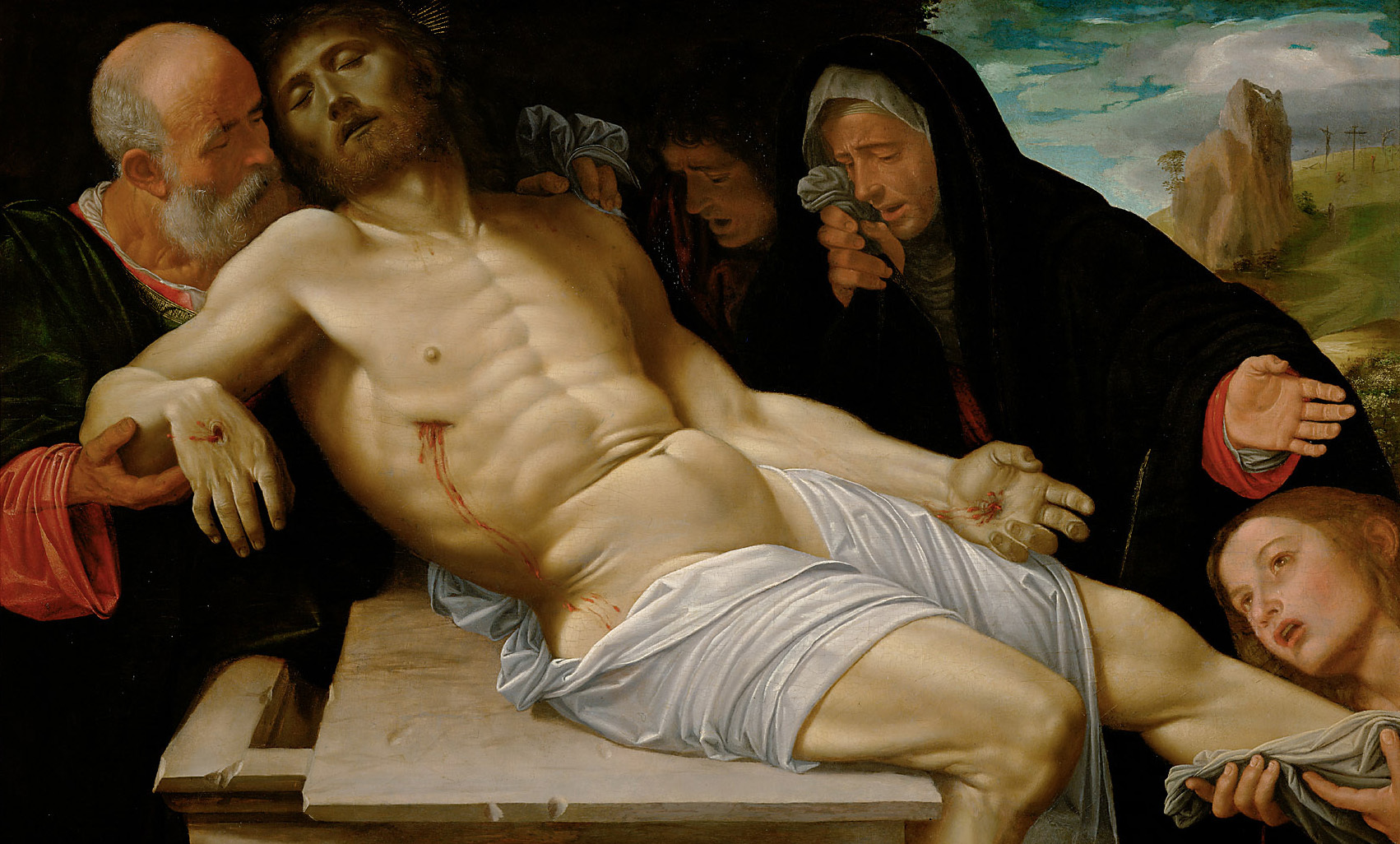
The Mourning of Christ, c. 1513–1520, oil on wood, Kunsthistorisches Museum, Vienna

Giovanni Girolamo Savoldo, also called Girolamo da Brescia (c. 1480–1485 – after 1548), was an Italian High Renaissance painter active mostly in Venice, although he also worked in other cities in northern Italy. He is noted for his subtle use of color and chiaroscuro, and for the sober realism of his works, which are mostly religious subjects, with a few portraits. His portraits are given interest by their accessories or settings; "some even look like extracts from larger narratives".

About 40 paintings by Savoldo are known in all, six of them portraits; only a handful of drawings by him are known. He was highly regarded in his own lifetime; several repetitions of works were commissioned from him, and copies of his work made by others. He slipped from general awareness, however, and many of his works were assigned to more famous artists, especially Giorgione, by the art trade. Awareness of his oeuvre revived in the 19th century, though the dating of many paintings remains controversial among specialists.

== Biography ==
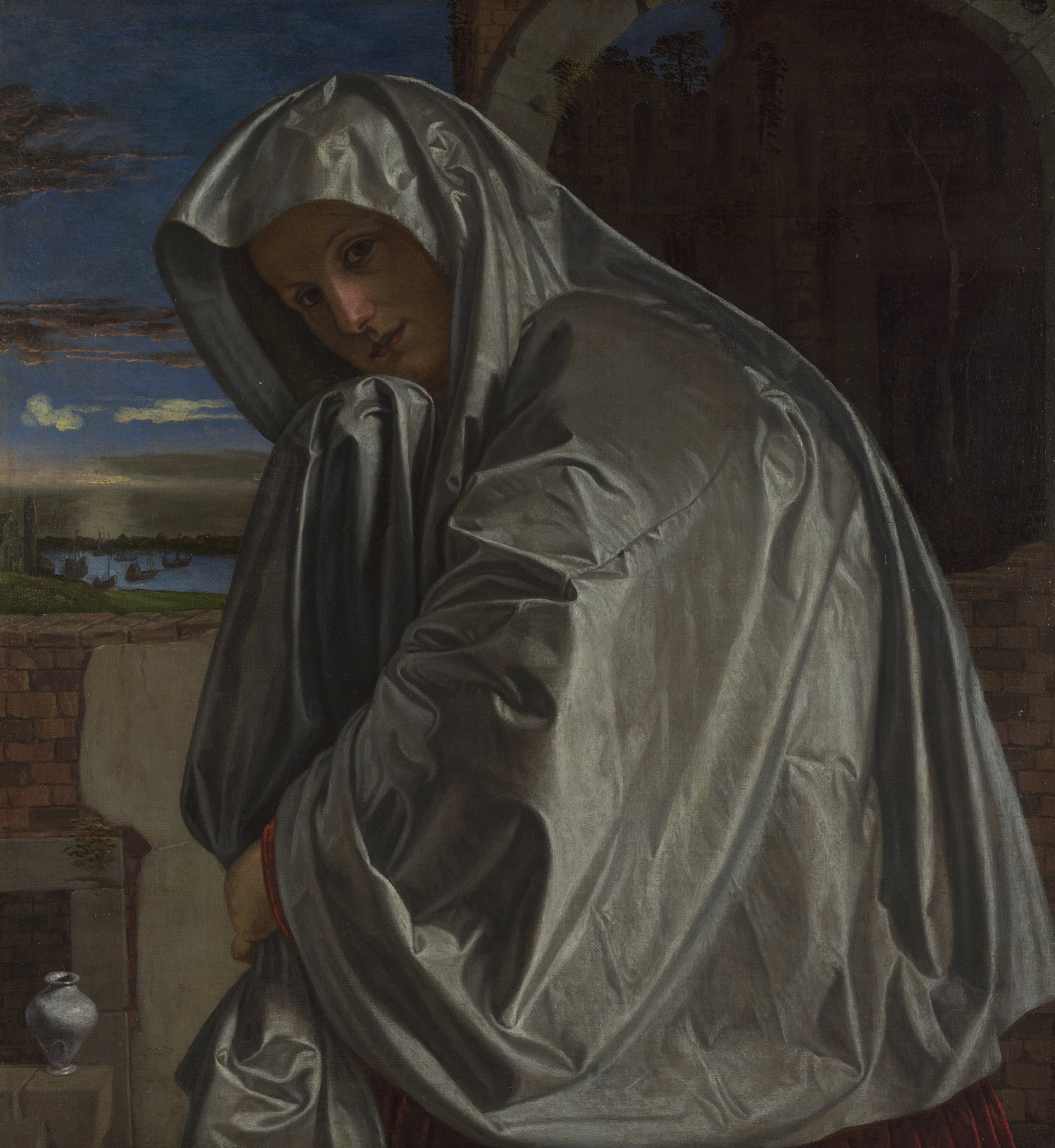
Mary Magdalene, c. 1535–1540. oil on canvas, National Gallery, London

Savoldo was born in Brescia, but little is known about his early years. Some sources claim that he was known as Girolamo Bresciano. By 1506 he was in Parma, and by 1508 he had joined the Florentine painters' guild. In this period he finished the Rest on the Flight into Egypt (Augsburg), the Elijah Fed by the Raven (National Gallery of Art, Washington), and a Deposition.

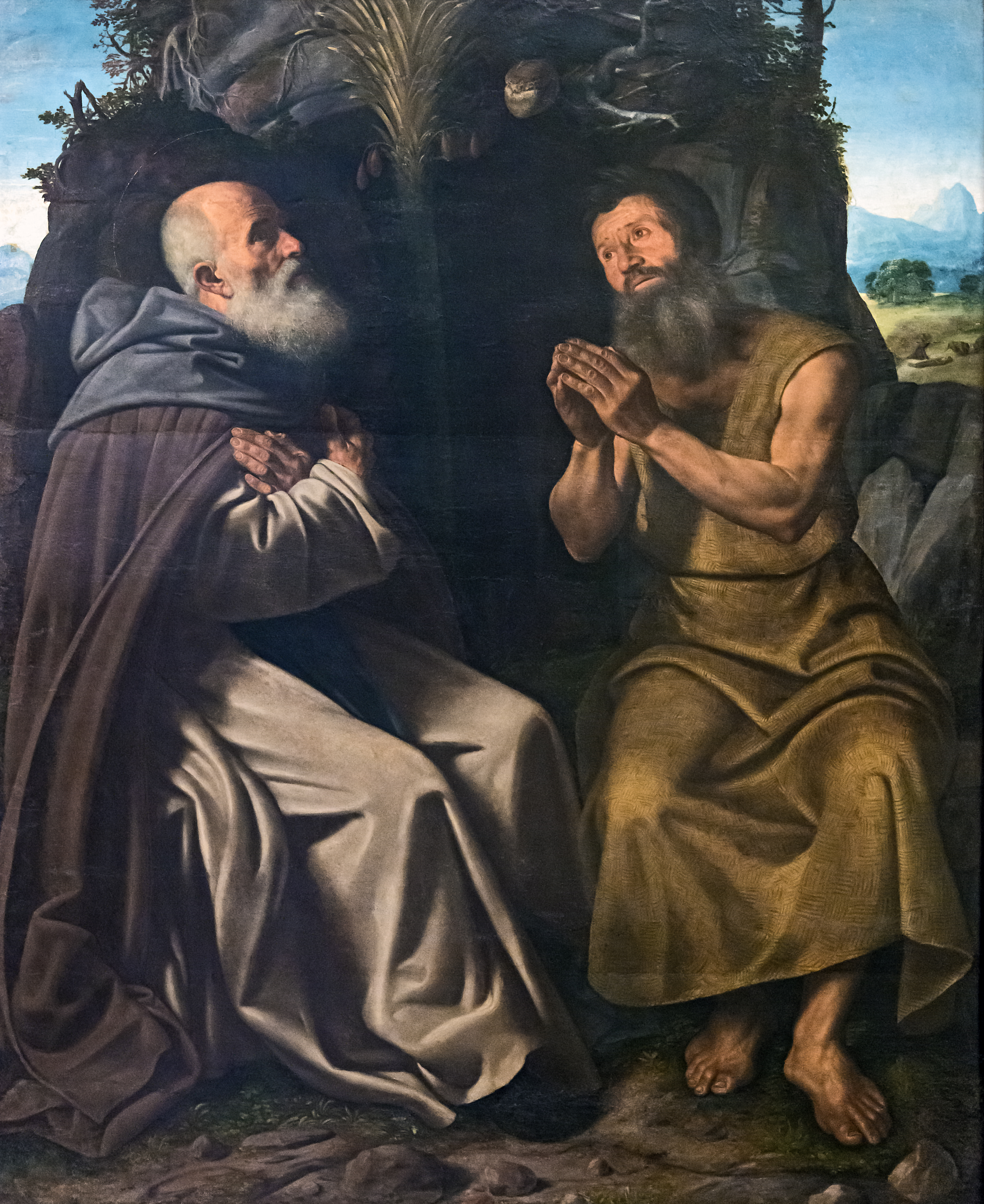
Saint Anthony Abbot and Saint Paul Hermit, Gallerie dell'Accademia, Venice

In 1515 he painted the Portrait of a Clad Warrior, traditionally identified as Gaston of Foix. Also from the same period is his Temptation of Saint Anthony. In this work, which is in the Timken Museum of Art, Savoldo shows the saint with his hands clasped in prayer, fleeing from a hellish vision into a daylight pastoral landscape. Like other northern Italian painters of the time, Savoldo was interested in Flemish painting, particularly the nightmarish monsters of the Flemish artist Hieronymus Bosch, which influenced his depiction of the tormentors in this work. As the saint flees, his hands point to a monastery, a reminder that he was the father of Christian monasticism. These works were appreciated by the commissioners from Venice, where Savoldo relocated before 1521.

On June 15, 1524, Savoldo signed a contract for an altarpiece for the church of San Domenico in Pesaro (now in the Pinacoteca di Brera, Milan). In 1527, he completed a Saint Jerome for the Brescian family Averoldi, probably the depiction of that saint in the National Gallery, London. From the 1530s dates a Nativity at the National Gallery of Art in Washington, which seems influenced by the lambent painting of the same subject by his contemporary, Correggio. In 1533 Savoldo painted a Madonna with Four Saints in the church of Santa Maria in Organo (in Verona), while in 1537–1538 he executed the altarpiece for the main altar of Santa Croce, Brescia (destroyed during World War II). From 1540 are the two Nativity paintings for the church of San Giobbe of Venice and the church of San Barnaba of Brescia, as well as the famous Magdalene painting.

Savoldo's students in Venice included Paolo Pino. Savoldo may have spent some years of his life in Milan, and is known to have made paintings for Francesco II Sforza, Duke of Milan, in 1534. Savoldo had a Dutch wife. The exact date of his death is not known: in 1548 he was cited as still living in Venice, though vecchione ("very old"). After his death, he was almost entirely forgotten for three centuries. A rediscovery of his oeuvre began in the mid-nineteenth century; the art historian Creighton Gilbert says that Savoldo was "one of the last artists to be raised to the ranks of the major High Renaissance masters".

== Overview ==
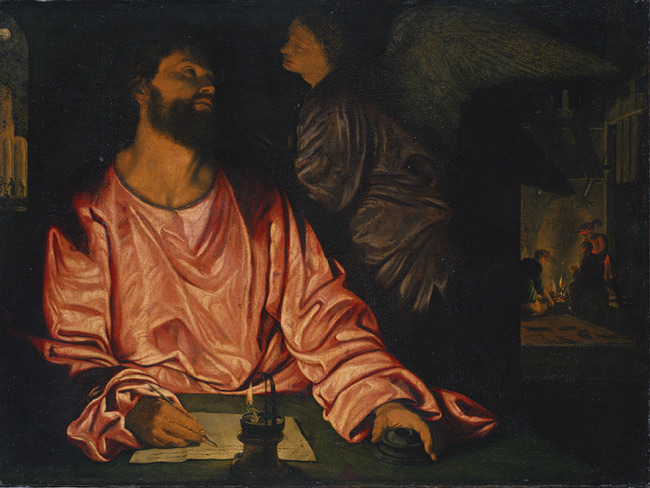
Saint Matthew and the Angel, 1534, oil on canvas, Metropolitan Museum of Art, New York

Savoldo's paintings show eclectic influences, and combine Venetian coloration with Lombard modeling to achieve a quiet lyricism. He appears to have been influenced by Titian and Lorenzo Lotto and, in his preoccupation with clearly defined shapes in light, by Cima da Conegliano and Flemish painters. Among artists of his time, he was unusual in his marked preference for compositions showing a single figure, or few figures in a quiet setting. His corpus of works is not large, comprising about 40 paintings and ten drawings.

Savoldo was noted during his lifetime for his mastery of nocturnal effects. His Saint Matthew and the Angel (1534; Metropolitan Museum of Art), which Andrea Bayer has called "one of the most evocative nocturnal scenes in Italian painting", prefigures Caravaggio's famous painting in the Contarelli Chapel in Rome, with a luminescent gown standing in contrast to the dark background.

His Mary Magdalene (c. 1535–1540; London, National Gallery), one of several versions Savoldo painted of this subject, is a masterpiece of lighting effects. The Magdalene is shrouded in a white satin mantle that covers her head, leaving her face in shadow, with the silvery expanse of drapery relieved by the merest glimpse of a red sleeve.

== Selected works ==
See also Category:Paintings by Girolamo Savoldo

- The Temptation of Saint Anthony (c. 1515–1520), Timken Museum of Art, San Diego, CA, USA
- The Temptation of Saint Jerome (c. 1515–1530), Pushkin Museum, Moscow
- Elijah in the Desert (c. 1520), National Gallery of Art, Washington, USA
- Saint Anthony and Saint Paul as Hermits (c. 1520), Gallerie dell'Accademia, Venice
- Saint Matthew and the Angel (1534), Metropolitan Museum of Art, New York, USA
- San Domenico di Pesaro Altarpiece (1524–1526), Pinacoteca di Brera, Milan
- Tobias and the Angel (c. 1527), Galleria Borghese, Rome
- Portrait of a Clad Warrior (c. 1529), Louvre Museum, Paris
- Transfiguration (c. 1530), Uffizi Gallery, Florence
- Adoration of the Shepherds (c. 1540), Pinacoteca Tosio Martinengo, Brescia
- Portrait of a Young Flautist (c. 1540), Pinacoteca Tosio Martinengo, Brescia
- Mary Magdalene (1535–1540), Getty Center, Los Angeles; National Gallery, London; Contini-Bonacossi Collection/Uffizi, Florence; Gemäldegalerie, Berlin

== Sources ==
- Bayer, A., & Metropolitan Museum of Art (New York, N.Y.). (2005). North of the Apennines: Sixteenth-century Italian painting in Venice and the Veneto. New York: Metropolitan Museum of Art. OCLC 62121606
- Cristiani, Federico Nicoli (1807). Della Vita delle pitture di Lattanzio Gambara; Memorie Storiche aggiuntevi brevi notizie intorno a' più celebri ed eccelenti pittori Bresciani. Spinelli e Valgiti, Brescia. pp. 186–187.
- Freedberg, Sydney J. (1993). Pelican History of Art (ed.). Painting in Italy, 1500–1600. Penguin Books Ltd. pp. 340–344.
- Gilbert, Creighton. "Savoldo, Giovanni Girolamo." Grove Art Online. Oxford Art Online. Oxford University Press. Web. Retrieved June 13, 2013.
- Hartt, Frederick, History of Italian Renaissance Art, (2nd edn.)1987, Thames & Hudson (US Harry N Abrams), ISBN 0500235104
- Penny, Nicholas, National Gallery Catalogues (new series): The Sixteenth Century Italian Paintings, Volume I, 2004, National Gallery Publications Ltd, ISBN 1857099087
