= Portrait of a Clad Warrior =

c. 1529 painting by Giovanni Girolamo Savoldo

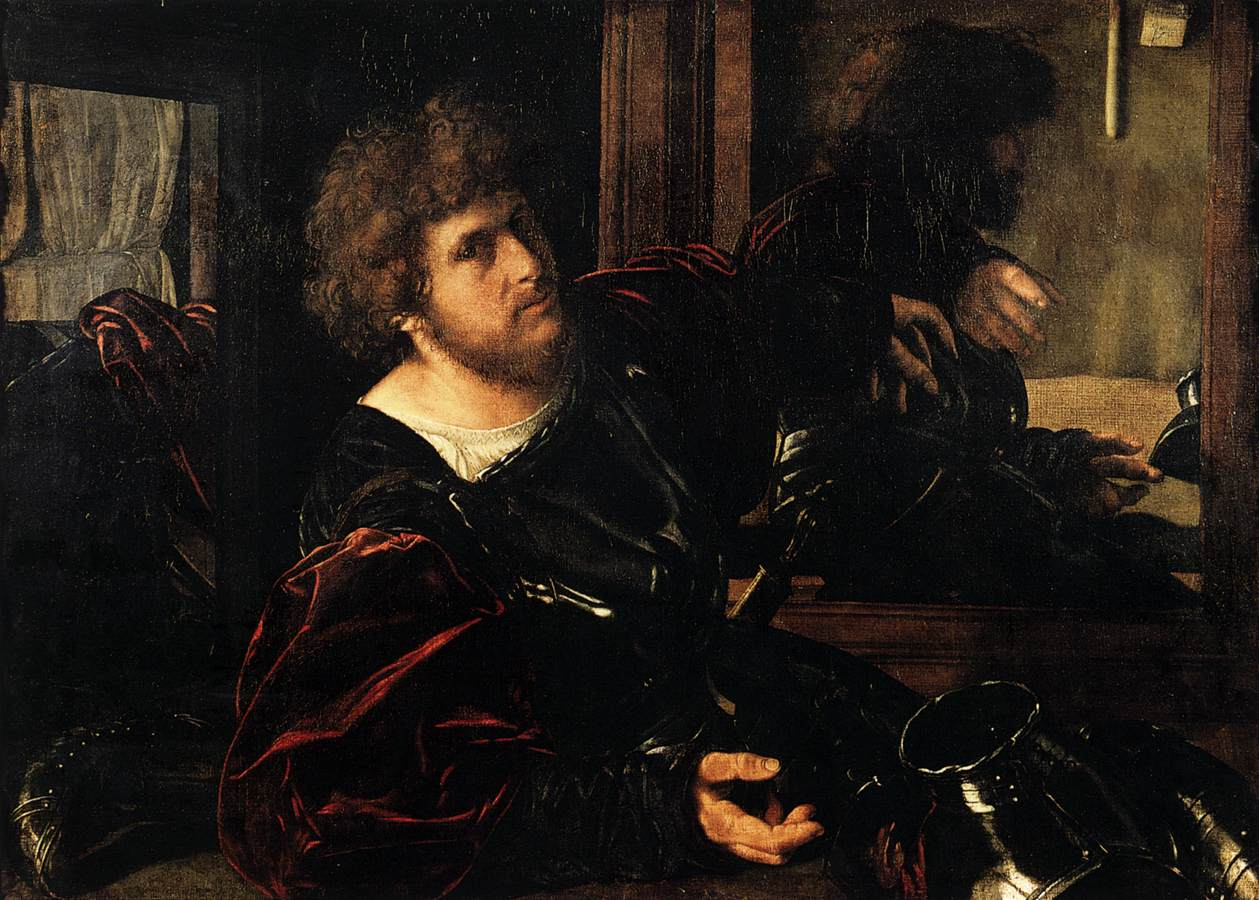
- Artist: Giovanni Girolamo Savoldo
- Year: c. 1529
- Medium: oil on canvas
- Dimensions: 91 cm × 123 cm (36 in × 48 in)
- Location: Louvre Museum; Paris

The Portrait of a Clad Warrior, also known as Portrait of Gaston of Foix, is an oil on canvas painting by the Italian High Renaissance painter Giovanni Girolamo Savoldo, dating to c. 1529 and housed in the Louvre Museum, in Paris.

== History and description ==
The subject was traditionally identified with the French military leader Gaston of Foix, Duke of Nemours, or as a self-portrait, although there is no documentary evidence for either hypothesis. The identification with Gaston de Foix is devoid of documentary evidence, as well as certainly improbable, since it would have been a posthumous portrait lacking the composure more suited to this purpose.

The painting depicts a man wearing military armor in a small room with two mirrors. In a narrow space, the man is portrayed leaning against a shelf, while he also leans forward towards the viewer, settling along a deep diagonal, which ends with his outstretched left arm, indicating the reflected image. The presence of the triple image (front, back and side) certainly refers to a lost painting by Giorgione, who had been created to demonstrate the superiority of painting in the lively debate on the "comparison of the arts". Savoldo, like Giorgione, wanted to demonstrate that painting was also capable of representing multiple views of the same subject, in the same way as sculpture, and without having to go around it.

The theme of light and reflections is also magnified by the metallic luster of the armor and the red velvet sleeves, which create those chromatic flashes between dense and dark shadow fields, typical of the painter's production.

== See also ==
- Portrait of Andrea Odoni
