= San Domenico di Pesaro Altarpiece =

Painting by Giovanni Girolamo Savoldo

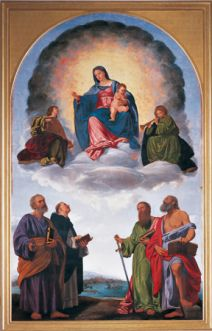
- Artist: Giovanni Girolamo Savoldo
- Year: 1524–1526
- Medium: oil on wood
- Dimensions: 505 cm × 212 cm (199 in × 83 in)
- Location: Pinacoteca di Brera, Milan

The San Domenico di Pesaro Altarpiece is an oil-on-panel painting created ca. 1524–1526 by the Italian Renaissance artist Giovanni Girolamo Savoldo, now in the Pinacoteca di Brera, in Milan. The work dates to the same period as Savoldo's Rest on the Flight into Egypt (Castelbarco Albani collection, Milan), also produced for San Domenico. It shows the Madonna and Child seated between two angel musicians, while in the lower register it shows (from left to right) Saint Peter, Saint Dominic, Saint Paul and Saint Jerome.

== History ==
In 1524 the Dominicans of the San Domenico Monastery in Pesaro commissioned a large altarpiece for the high altar from Savoldo, who had settled in Venice a few years earlier. The contract was signed on 15 June by Prior Innocenzo da Pesaro. The commission also included a cymatium showing a "Pieta of Our Lord Jesus Christ", identified with The Dead Christ Supported by Joseph of Arimathea (Cleveland Museum of Art) and a lost predella (made up of two "quadriciti" and of a tabernacle door painted with the face of Saint Peter Martyr).

The work was broken up and dispersed in the 17th century, probably around 1646 when it was taken down for the Baroque remodelling of the church's interior. An inscription on the obverse records the central panel being "raised" in 1797 and when the monastery was suppressed in 1808 the French authorities had the work sent to Brera. Due to its size (5.05 by 2.12 m) it has remained in the same room ever since except for during the world wars. It remained in place during a recent restoration, carried out within a transparent polycarbonate display case on a mobile platform and completed in 2005.

== Description ==
The altarpiece depicts the Madonna and Child who, seated on a cloud between two musician angels, sends a blessing to the four saints below, inserted in a landscape, which are (from left to right) Saint Peter, Saint Dominic, Saint Paul and Saint Jerome. It is a mystical vision, evoked by the saints and their readings.

The figures of the saints, depicted in a larger than life size, are located in the foreground and represented with a viewpoint from below. Between them opens a landscape with Venice seen from the Fondamenta Nuove, so as to bring out the Dominican basilica of San Zanipolo at the center of the composition, the mother house of the Dominicans of the areas of influence of the Venice Republic. If in the lower half a natural light diffuses, the upper one is dominated by the dazzling luminous cloud behind Maria, made of seraphs in flight, citing Titian's altarpiece of the Assumption.

In the drapery of the characters the artist used his particular way of making them heavy and shiny like velvet, with strong silver reflections given by dense and full-bodied brushstrokes.
