= Adoration of the Shepherds (Savoldo) =

Painting by Giovanni Girolamo Savoldo

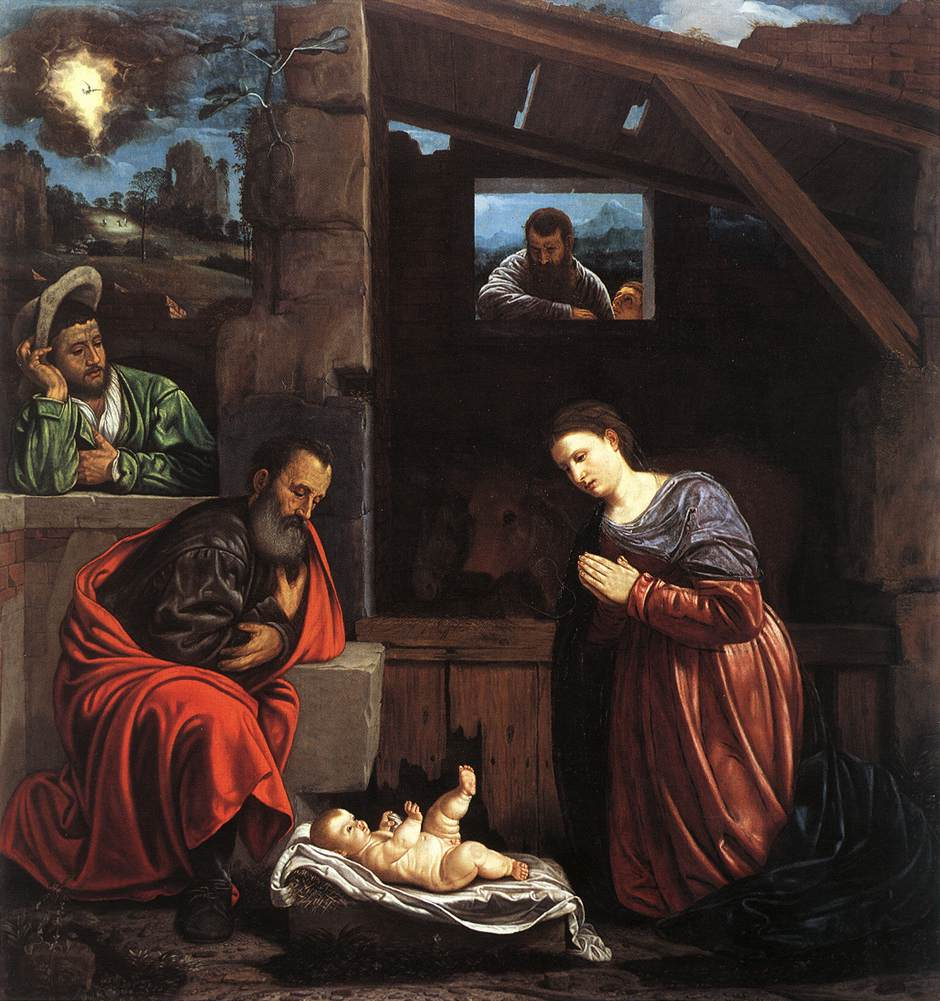
Adoration of the Shepherds (c. 1540) by Savoldo

Adoration of the Shepherds c. 1540, is an oil on 188 x 178 cm wood panel painting by Giovanni Girolamo Savoldo, now in the Pinacoteca Tosio Martinengo in Brescia. It was one of the painter's last works and he also produced variants on it, including one in San Giobbe in Venice.

== Description and style ==
The painting is part of the painter's last phase, characterized by intense and sometimes dark shades and by a use of pasty color, capable of giving particular effects that simulate velvet.

The scene of the adoration of the Child is set in front of the hut, in which the ox and the donkey protrude from the half-light. Further behind, from a small window, two shepherds lean to assist and a third is leaning against a wall on the right. Their description, with lively everyday accents, follows a Flemish tradition (used for example by Bosch, which the artist had admired in Venice). However, these popular elements are ennobled by the artist's refined and elegant technique.

Joseph and Mary, devoid of haloes and attributes, have simple, almost rustic features. On the carpenter's shoe leaning forward you can see the detail of a veil of dust: a note of realism that later influenced Caravaggio.

In the distance, a glow illuminates the sky with dense turquoise tones: it is the only supernatural hint of the painting, representing the angel who gave the announcement.
