= The Temptation of Saint Jerome =

Painting by Givanni Girolamo Savoldo

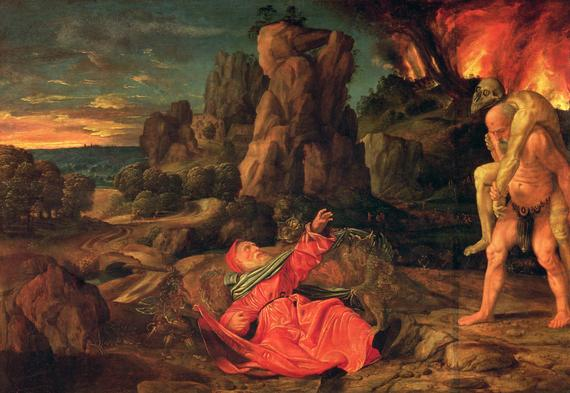
The Temptation of Saint Jerome (c. 1521–1525) by Savoldo

The Temptation of Saint Jerome is an oil-on-panel painting created c.1521–1525 by the Italian Renaissance artist Giovanni Girolamo Savoldo. It is now in the Pushkin Museum in Moscow. It may relate to the same artist's The Temptation of Saint Anthony (Timken Museum of Art, San Diego).

Originally produced for a private 'studiolo', it was a homage to similar works by Hieronymus Bosch, some of which were in Cardinal Domenico Grimani's collection in Venice. The saint's vision to the right is also heavily influenced by the figures of Aeneas and Anchises in Marcantonio Raimondi's print of Raphael's The Fire in the Borgo, while the glow of the sunset refers to German Danube school painters.
