= Mary Magdalene (Savoldo) =

Painting by Giovanni Girolamo Savoldo

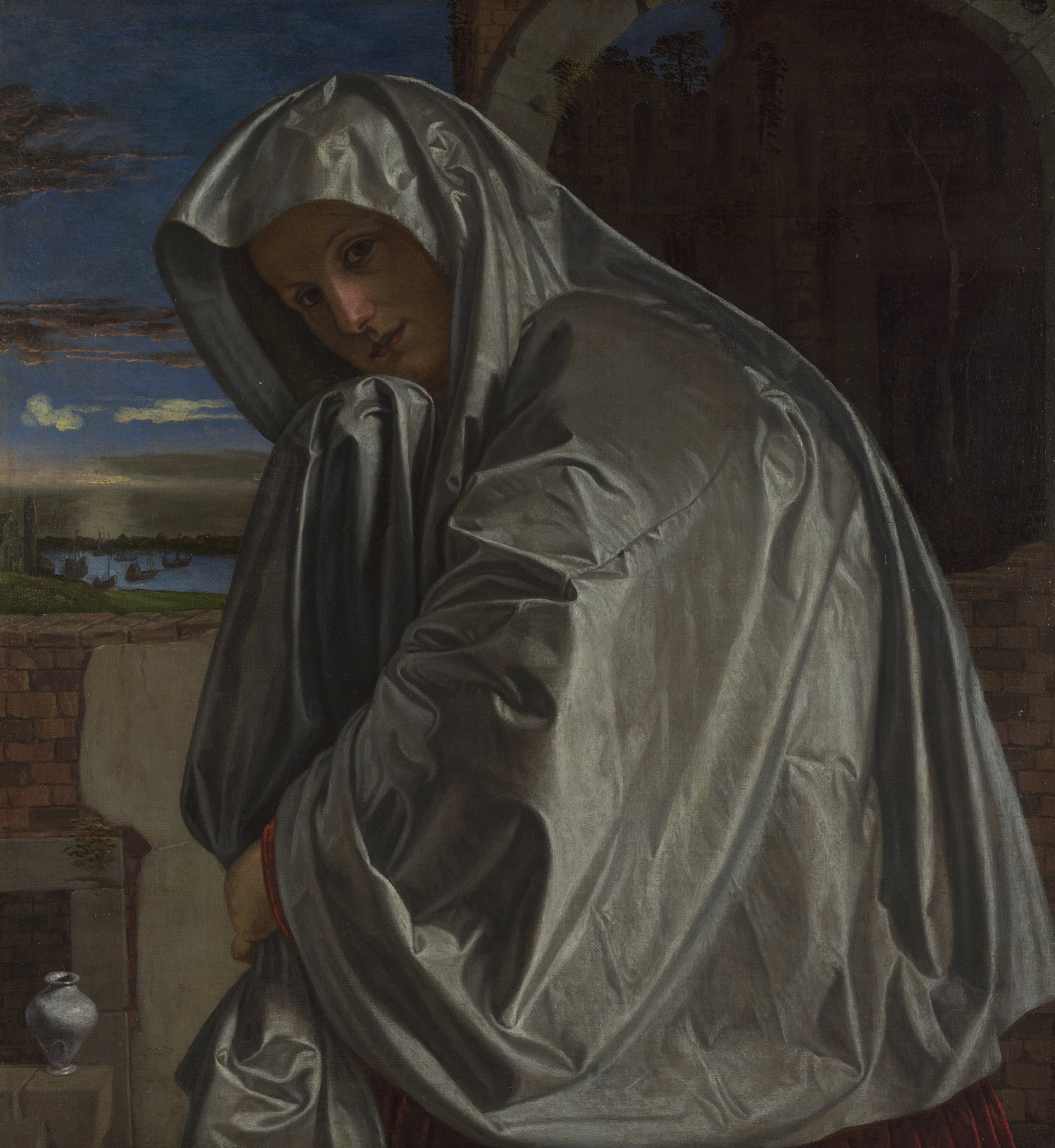
Mary Magdalene (c. 1535-1540) by Savoldo

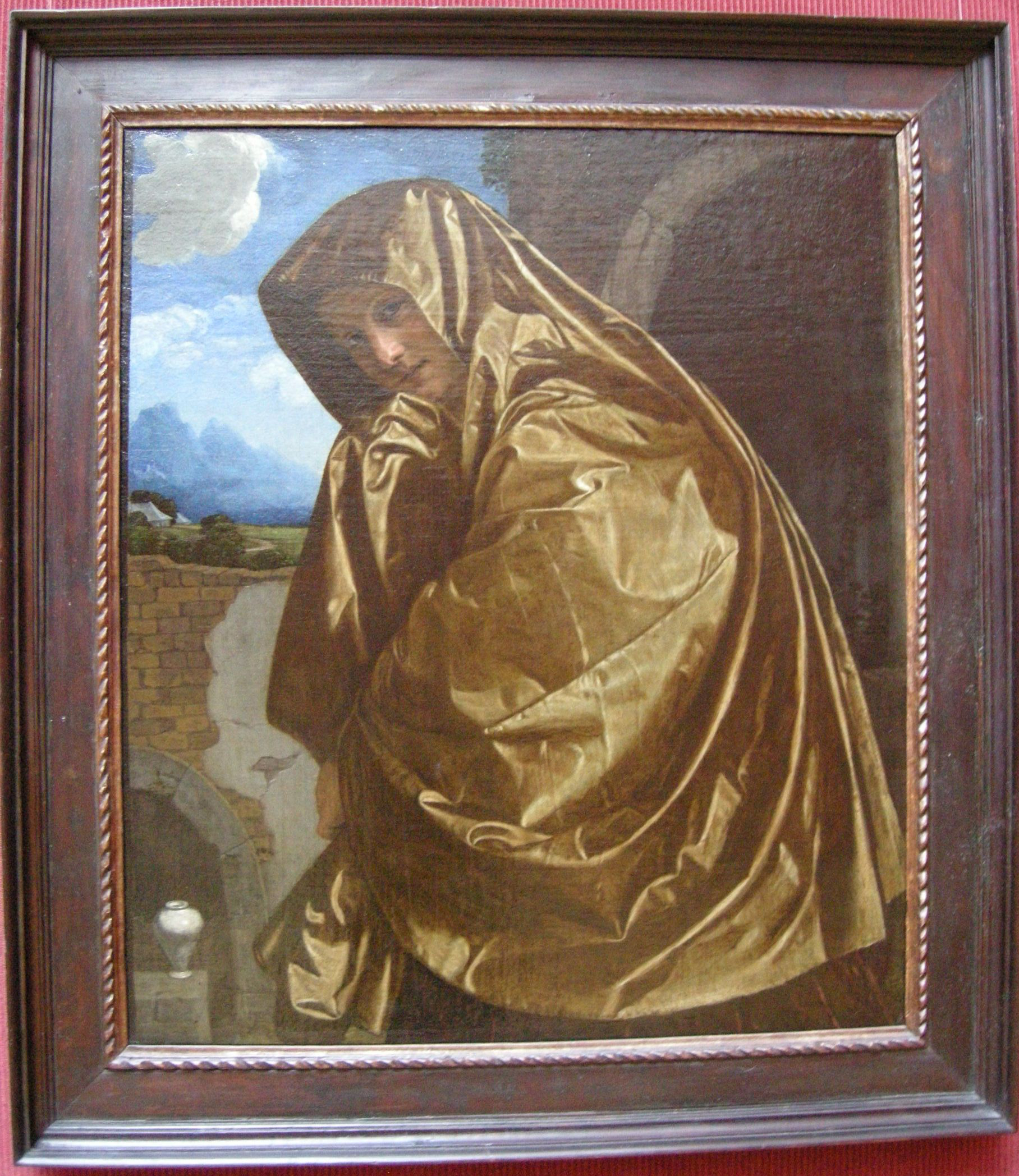
The Getty version

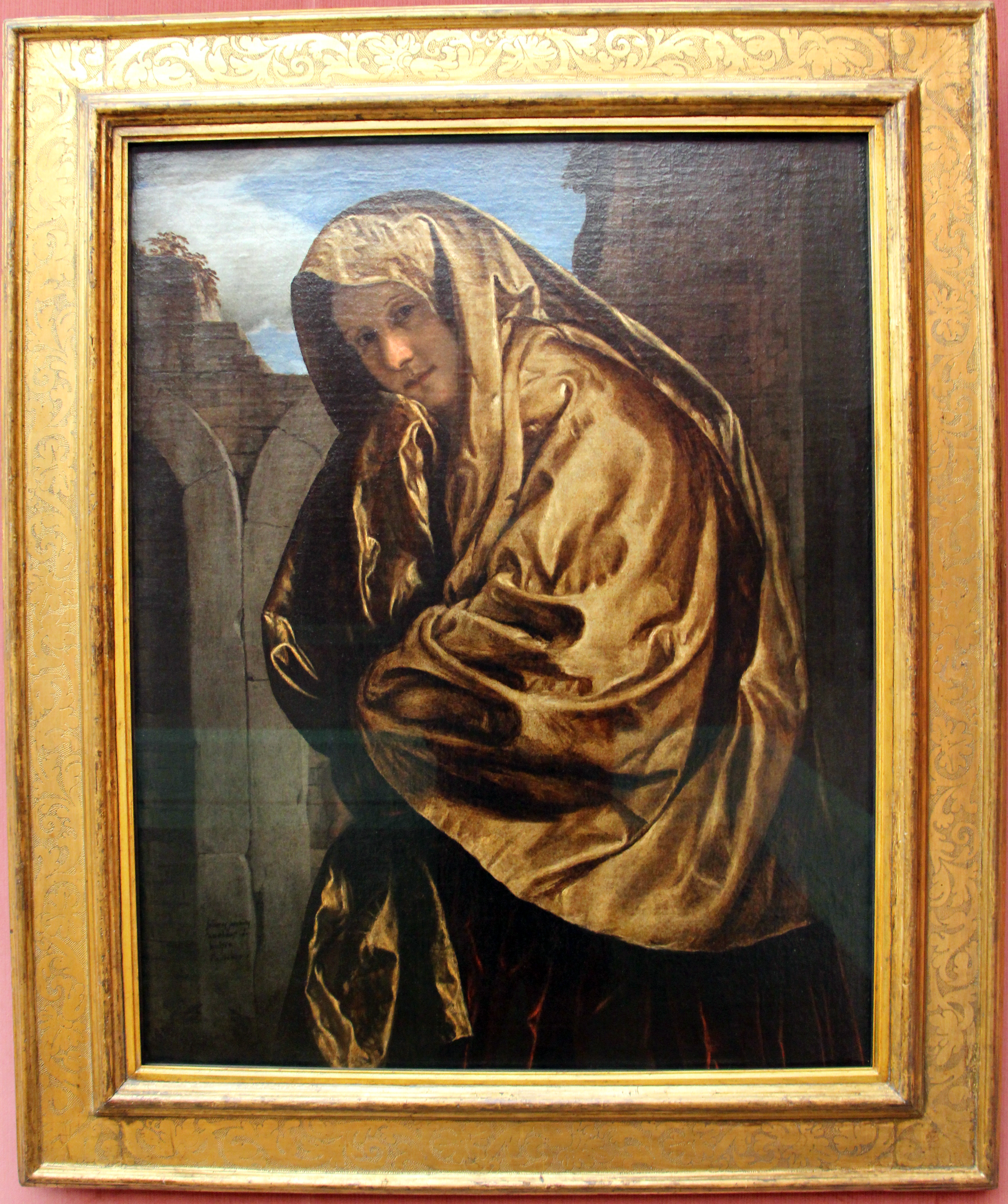
The Berlin version

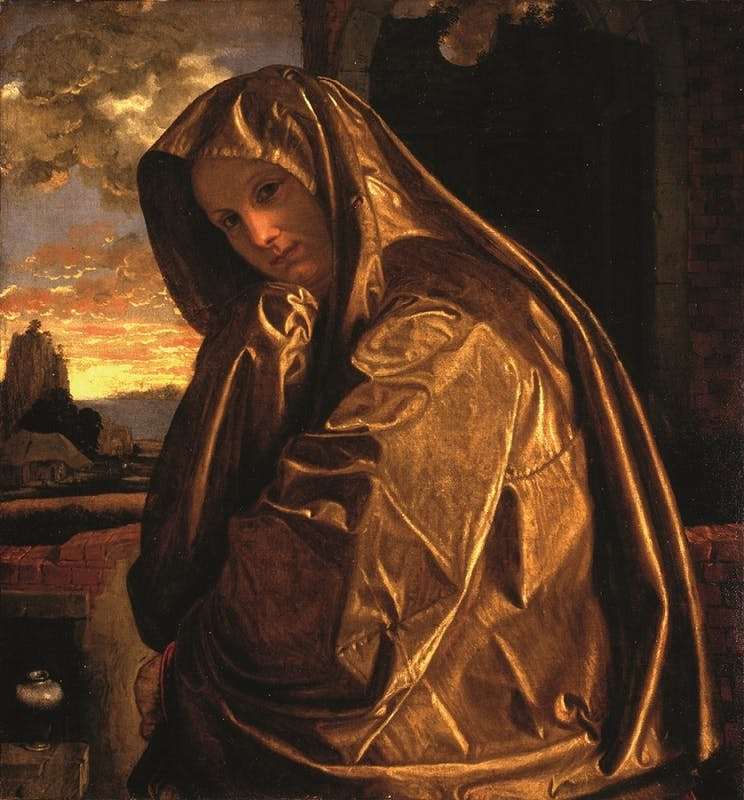
The Florence version

Mary Magdalene is a c.1535-1540 oil on canvas painting by Giovanni Girolamo Savoldo, now in the National Gallery, London, which acquired it in 1978.

It is generally considered to be the first of a series of four paintings of the subject, which was popular among private Venetian commissioners. The other three are in the:

- Contini Bonacossi collection in Florence - with a rocky outcrop added in the background, this copy was acquired by Bonacossi from the Giovannelli collection in Venice in 1935;
- Getty Museum in Los Angeles - with a gold mantle unlike the grey one in other versions, this copy was previously in Warwick Castle.
- Gemäldegalerie in Berlin - without the vase but signed
