= Transfiguration (Savoldo) =

Painting by Giovanni Girolamo Savoldo

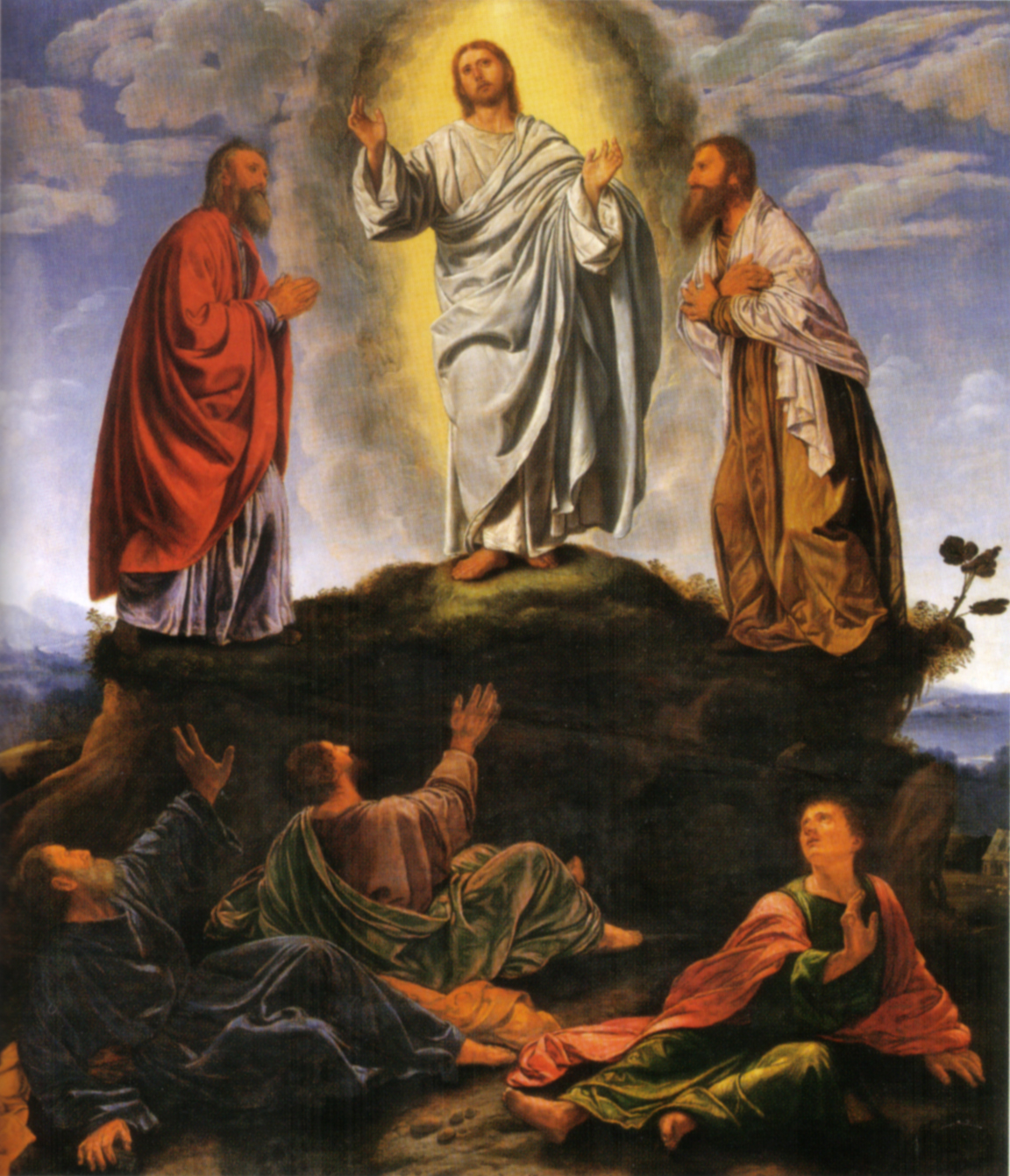
Transfiguration (c. 1530) by Savoldo

Transfiguration is a c. 1530 oil on panel painting by Giovanni Girolamo Savoldo of the Gospel episode the Transfiguration of Jesus. It is now in the Uffizi in Florence, which also holds a preparatory drawing for the work (n. 12803). Another study for the work is in the Pontus de la Gardia collection in Switzerland, whilst a late 16th century copy of the painting by Lomazzo is now in the Pinacoteca Ambrosiana, in Milan.

Marco Boschini described the work whilst it was in cardinal Leopoldo de' Medici's collection. At that time it was attributed to an unknown Venetian artist, though it was later reattributed to Tintoretto and then back to Savoldo.
