= Paolo Pino =

Italian painter

Paolo Pino (?-?, active between 1534 and 1565) was an Italian painter and art writer. He was born in Venice. A student of Giovanni Gerolamo Savoldo, he wrote the "Dialogo di pittura" (1548), which affirmed the supremacy of the Venetian School over the Florentine School and anticipated some aspects of the Mannerist style.

== Works ==
Writings

- Pino, Paolo (1548). Dialogo di Pittura di Messer Paolo Pino Nuovamente Dato in Luce. Pauolo Gherardo, Vinegia (Venice).

Paintings

- Portrait of a collector, Musée des Beaux-Arts, Chambéry, France.
- Portrait of Doctor Coignati, 1534, Uffizi

== Sources ==
Bibl. : Gilbert Creighton, « Antique Framework for Renaissance Art Theory : Alberti and Pino », Marsyas 3 (1946).
