= The Temptation of Saint Anthony (Savoldo) =

c. 1521 painting by Giovanni Girolamo Savoldo

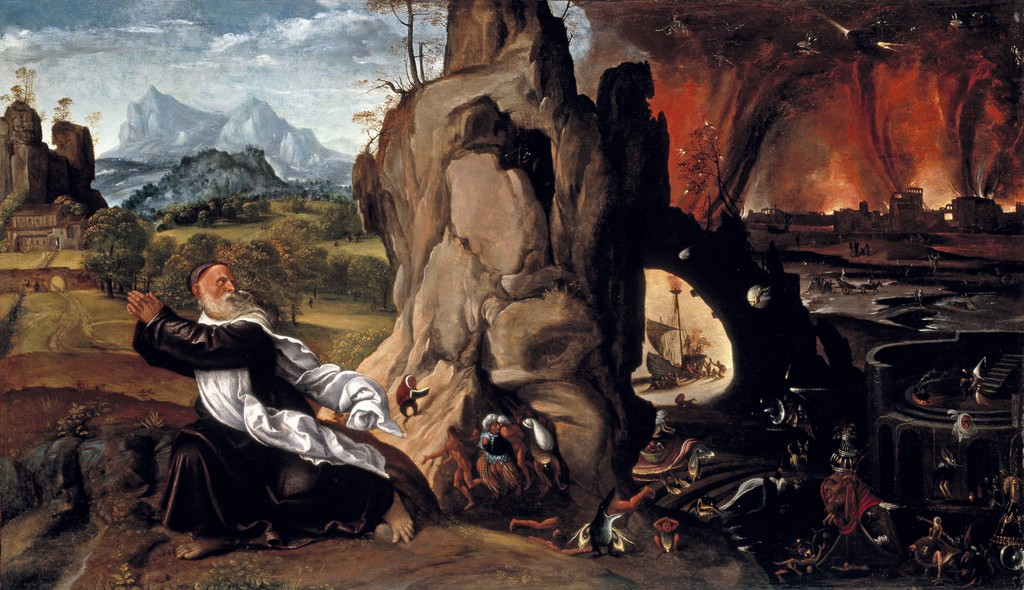
The Temptation of Saint Anthony (c. 1521–1525) by Savoldo

The Temptation of Saint Anthony or The Torment of Saint Anthony is an oil-on-panel painting executed c. 1521–1525 by the Italian Renaissance artist Giovanni Girolamo Savoldo. It is now in the Timken Museum of Art in San Diego. It may relate to the same artist's The Temptation of Saint Jerome on a similar theme.

Originally produced for a private studiolo, it is a homage to the work of Hieronymus Bosch, which Savoldo would have seen in cardinal Domenico Grimani's collection in Venice. From Bosch's The Hermit Saints he draws the motif of the saint fleeing to the left away from demons in a rocky infernal landscape on the right.
