= Portrait of a Young Flautist =

Painting by Giovanni Girolamo Savoldo

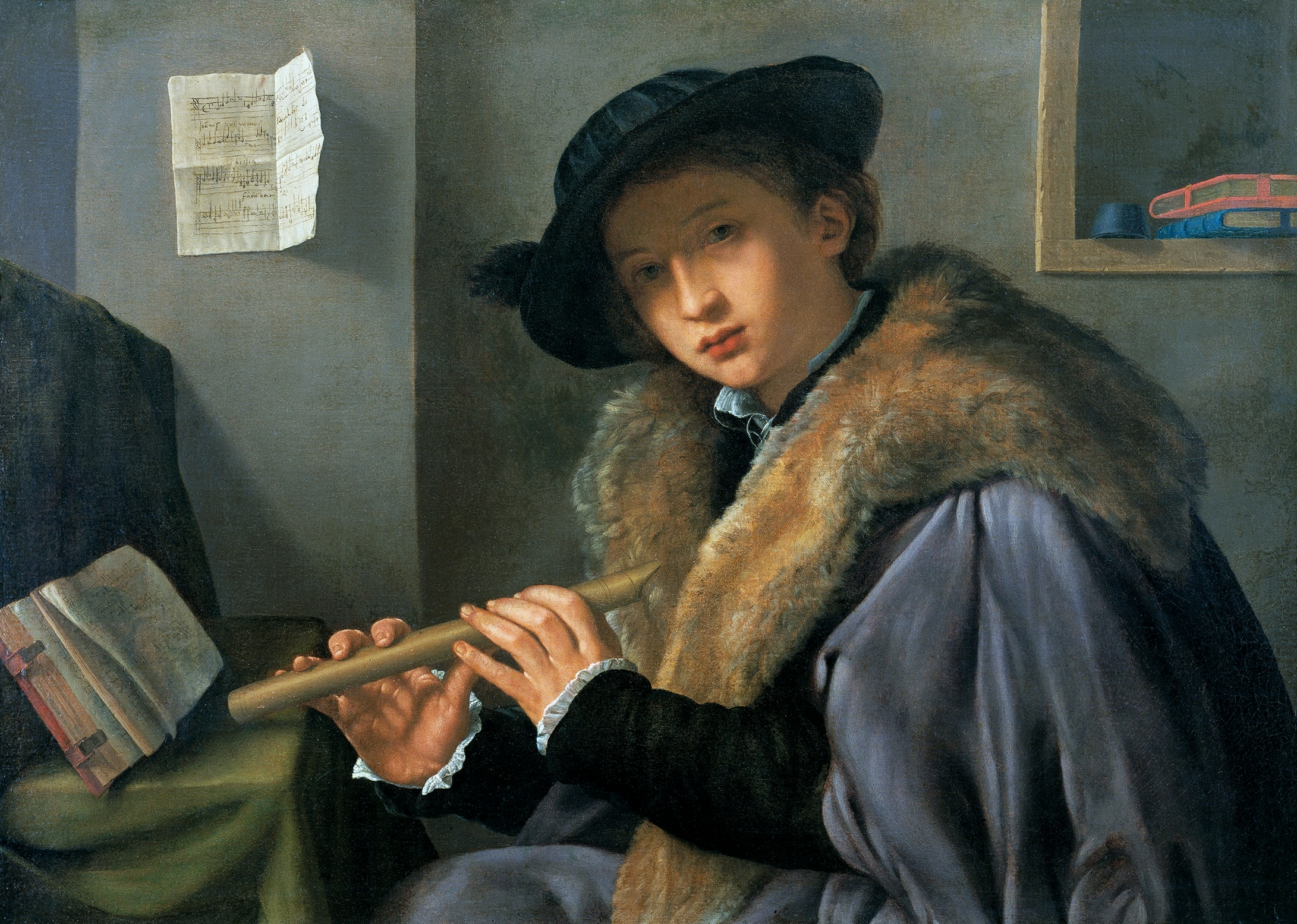
Portrait of a Young Flautist (c. 1540) by Savoldo

Portrait of a Young Flautist or The Flute Player is an oil on canvas painting by Giovanni Girolamo Savoldo, created c. 1540, now in the Pinacoteca Tosio Martinengo in Brescia.

The work was first recorded in the 19th century, at which time it was in Lord Anherest's collection in Sevenoaks. It was first exhibited in London in 1894. It was acquired by Alessandro Contini Bonacossi, after being excluded from the bequest to the Uffizi, and sold by his heirs to Peter Sharp, a New York collector. It was later bought by Banca Popolare di Brescia and placed it its present home.

== Description ==
In a closed room a young man moves three-quarters towards the viewer, holding a flute with his hands, in front of a music book and with a sheet of music attached to the wall. At the right, a wall cabinet appears, where some books can be glimpsed. The boy is conspicuously dressed, denouncing his high social background, but a sense of melancholy is also evident, derived from a personal interpretation of Giorgione. In fact, Savoldo replaces the pastoral setting by a closed interior, in which the light is the master, measuring the solitude of the domestic interior and revealing the details of the objects, not much differently from how Vermeer will do in the following century. The shod hat casts a shadow over the boy's eyes, which appear so veiled and seem to reveal a restrained unhappiness. The heavy fur of the cloak also appears almost like a yoke, which causes the figure to curve slightly. His hands, on the other hand, are illuminated in an incident way, revealing an extraordinary piece of realism.
