= Gaston of Foix, Duke of Nemours =

French nobleman and famed military commander (1489–1512)

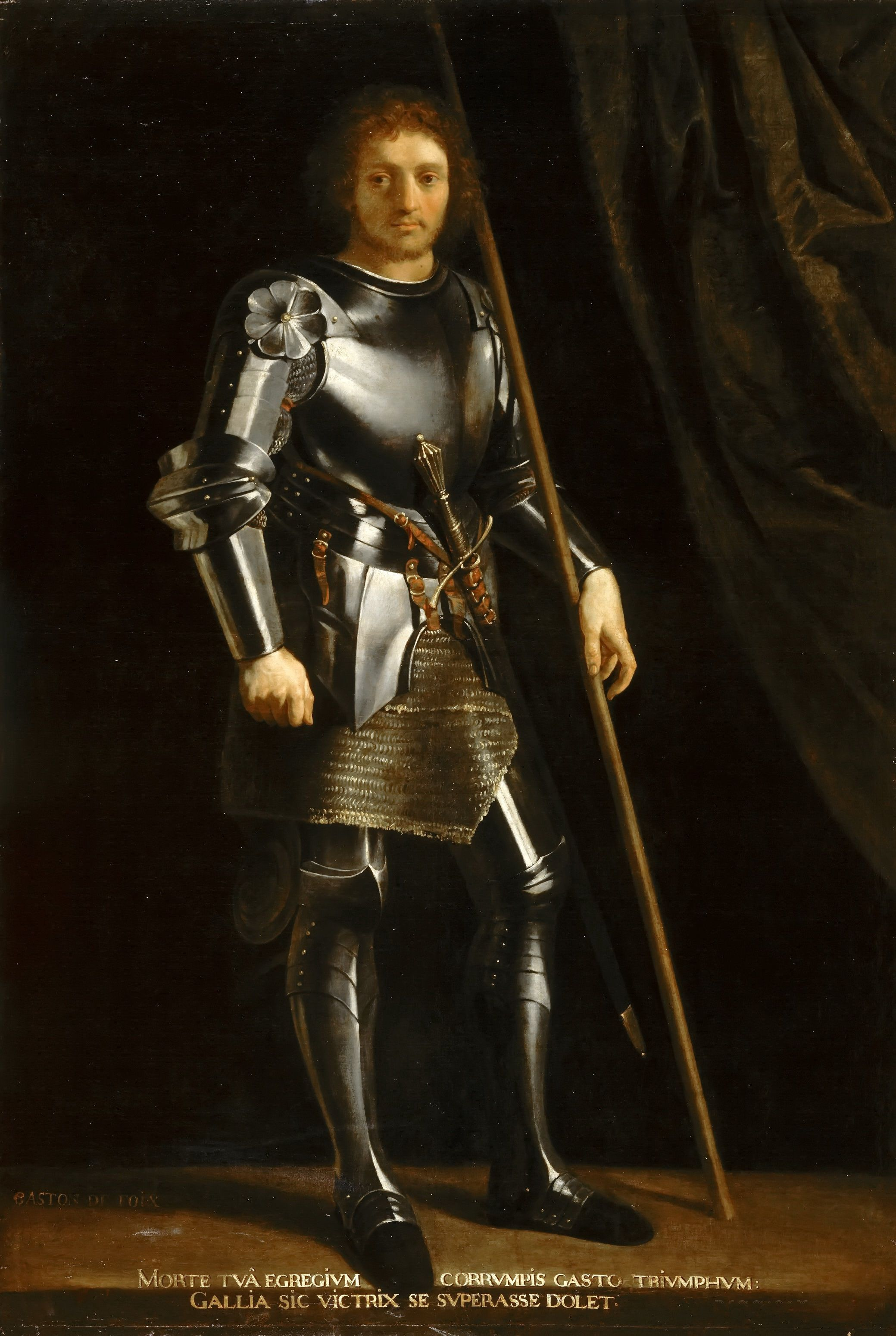
Gaston de Foix, 1630s depiction.

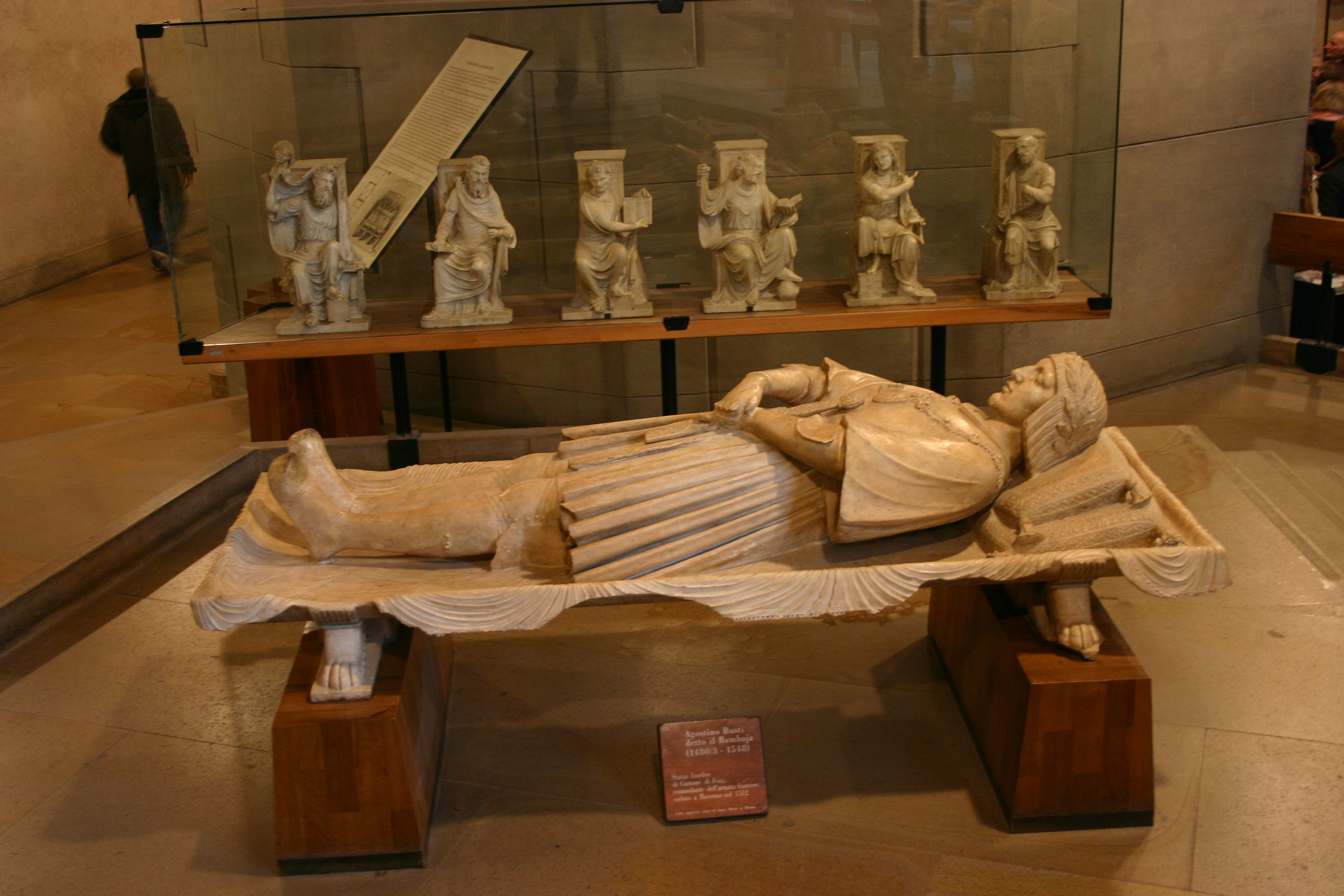
Agostino Busti's unfinished tomb for Gaston de Foix, in the Museo d'arte antica, Sforza Castle, Milan

Gaston de Foix, duc de Nemours (10 December 1489 – 11 April 1512), nicknamed The Thunderbolt of Italy, was a famed French military commander of the Renaissance. Nephew of King Louis XII of France and general of his armies in Italy from 1511 to 1512, he is noted for his military feats in a career which lasted no longer than a few months. The young general is regarded as a stellar commander well ahead of his time. An adept of lightning fast forced marches as well as sudden and bold offensives that destabilized contemporary armies and commanders, De Foix is mostly remembered for his six-month campaign against the Holy League in the War of the League of Cambrai. He met his end in that conflict, at the age of 22, during the Battle of Ravenna (1512), the last of his triumphs.

== Life ==
Born in Mazères, County of Foix, he was the second child but only son of John of Foix, Viscount of Narbonne and Marie d'Orléans. His older sister was Germaine of Foix, Queen consort of Aragon as the second wife of Ferdinand II.

His paternal grandparents were Gaston IV of Foix-Grailly and Queen regnant Eleanor of Navarre. His maternal grandparents were Charles, Duke of Orléans and Marie of Cleves. His only maternal uncle was Louis XII of France.

In 1511, Gaston arrived in Italy as a new commander at the age of 21. His presence and energy shifted the conflict into much higher levels of activity.

French forces had captured Bologna on 13 May 1511 and were under siege from a combined Papal-Spanish army commanded by Ramón de Cardona, the Viceroy of Naples. Gaston marched his army to Bologna and scattered the armies of the Holy League that retreated to Ravenna.

In October 1511, Pope Julius II formed the Holy League with Ferdinand of Aragon and the Republic of Venice. Its stated aim was to recover the lands taken from the Papacy, and this meant driving the French out of Italy. So Gaston now faced an invasion from the Swiss from the north, the Papal-Aragonese from the south and Venice from the east. The Swiss took Bellinzona in December 1511, but Gaston refrained from attacking them, fearing that if he left Milan then the people would rebel behind his back. Instead he reinforced Bologna that was under renewed attack from Julius II's army. The Swiss unable to draw Gaston out, retreated as winter set in. In February 1512, Gaston left Milan to relieve Brescia under attack from Venice, and conquered and sacked the city. It is said that when Julius II heard of the defeat he tore out his beard, but in the meantime Cardona had retaken most of the Romagna.

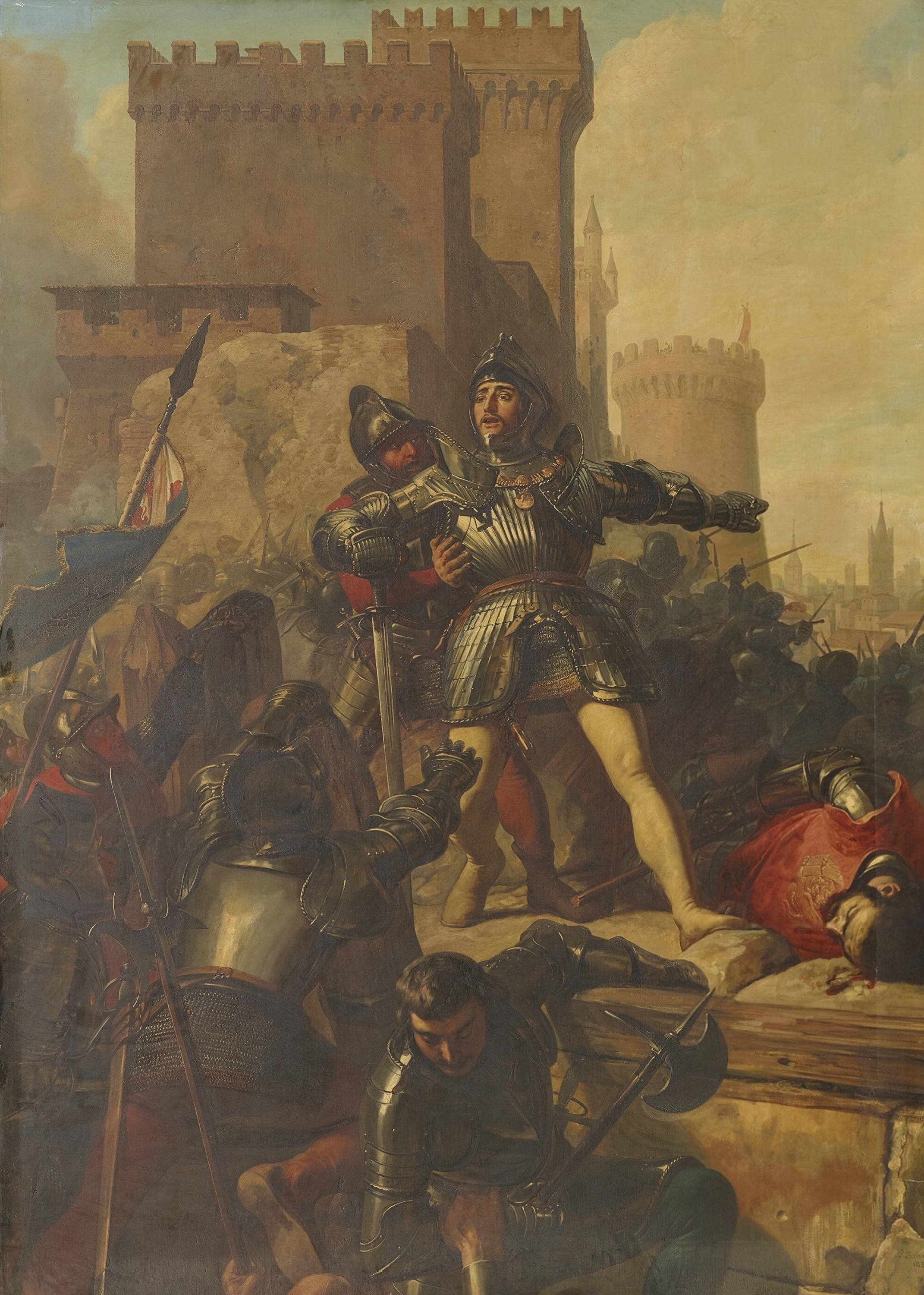
Prise de Brescia, 19 février 1512, oil on canvas by Charles-Philippe Larivière, 1837, Château de Versailles.

Gaston's force marched his army south through the snow to arrive at Ravenna unexpectedly and threatened to besiege it. Cardona at Imola now encamped his army on marshy ground before Ravenna. Gaston had about 23,000 soldiers, 8,500 of which were German landsknechte, and 54 artillery pieces. Cardona had roughly 16,000 troops and 30 artillery pieces; the garrison of Ravenna could count about 5,000 men. Gaston sent a formal invitation for battle to Cardona, who readily accepted.

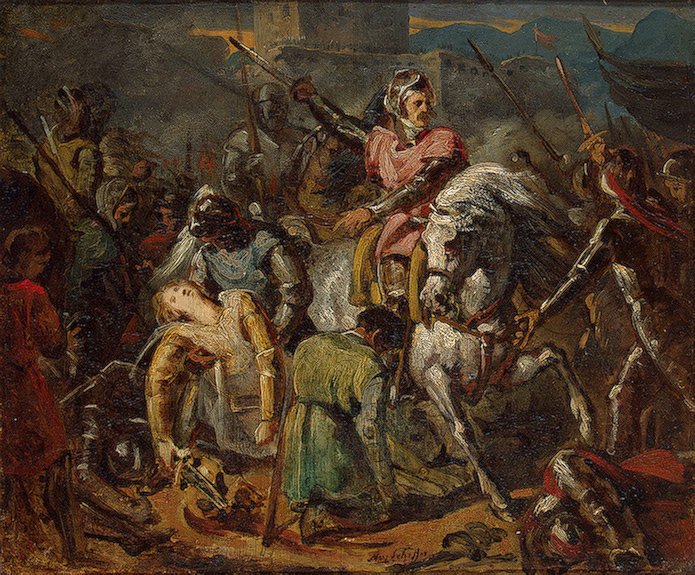
The Death of Gaston de Foix at Ravenna by the 19th century artist Ary Scheffer.

The decisive Battle of Ravenna was fought on 11 April 1512. The Spanish had their backs to the Ronco River and maintained a relatively secure front thanks to the strong entrenchments and obstacles prepared by the famous engineer Pedro Navarro. Gaston left 2,000 men to watch Ravenna and moved the rest of his force against Cardona. The French army crossed the stream between Ravenna and the Spanish camp without interference, formed in a semicircle around the enemy entrenchments, and started firing from the flanks into the Spanish position. The heavy bombardment did not trouble the well-protected Spanish infantry, but the cavalry could take no more and assaulted the French without orders. These charges were easily beaten back and the French counter-attacked. A bloody one-hour struggle ensued between the landsknechts and the Spanish in the entrenchments. At this moment, two cannons that Gaston had sent behind the Spanish lines opened fire and wrought havoc on the enemy rear. The Spanish withdrew and suffered tremendous casualties. During the pursuit, Gaston led a cavalry charge against a retreating Spanish infantry unit. His horse stumbled, he fell, and was shot and killed. French casualties were up to 9,000 while the Spanish lost nearly their entire army, as well as Pedro Navarro, who was captured.

Although the French victory at Ravenna allowed them to take that city and other important towns in the area, the death of Gaston and over a third of his army fatally weakened the French power in north Italy. When the Swiss returned and joined the Venetians and together marched on Milan, the new French Commander Jacques de La Palice and his demoralised army fled back to the Dauphiné in June.

Ironically, Ferdinand of Aragon, whose forces Gaston fought at Ravenna, had married his sister Germaine de Foix. She now inherited Gaston's claim to the Kingdom of Navarre against the ruling d'Albret family. Ferdinand invaded Navarre and was able to conquer and retain all of its Spanish territories.

== Tomb ==
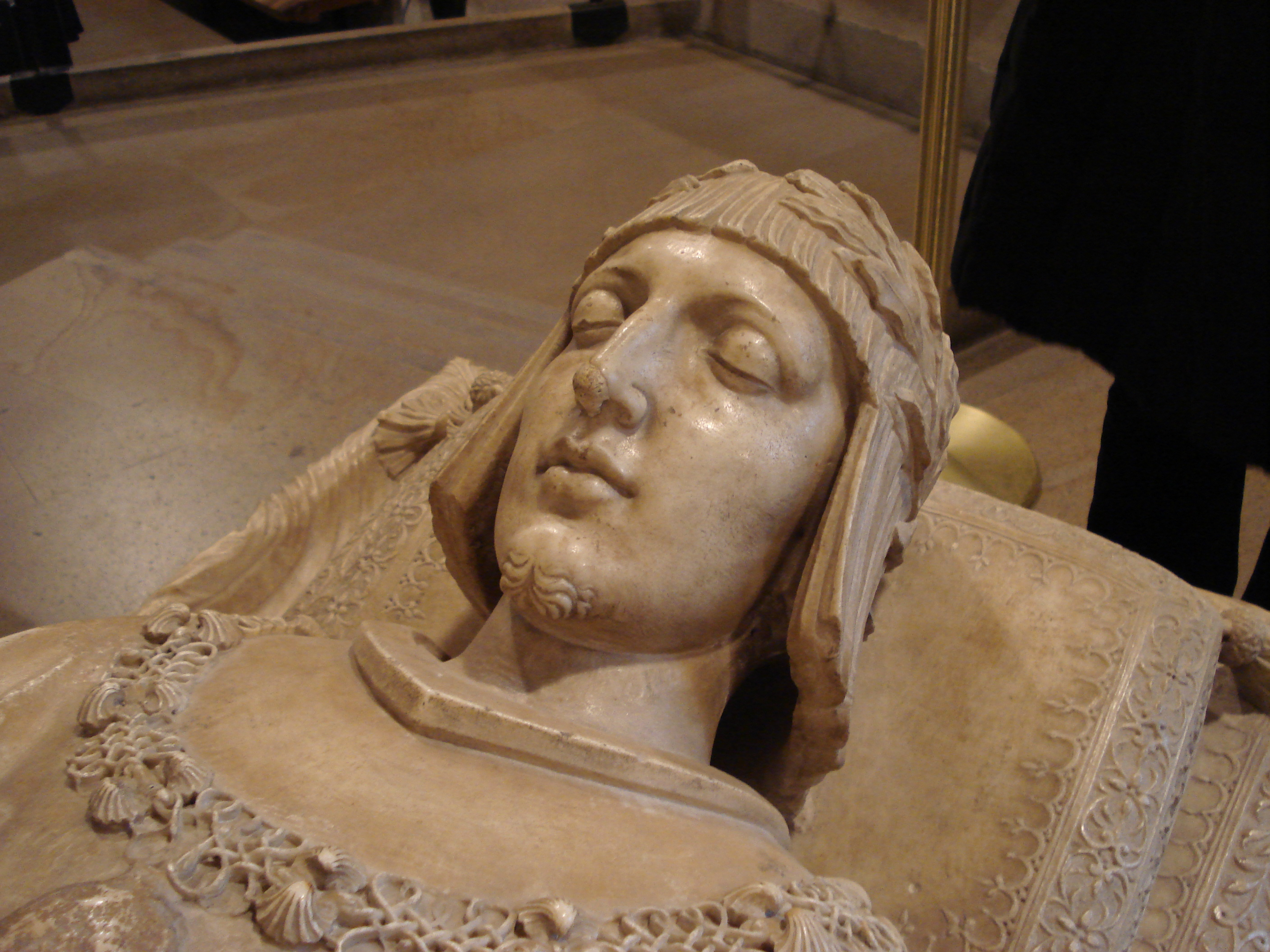
Grave of Gaston of Foix, Castello Sforzesco, Milan.

A very elaborate tomb was commissioned for Gaston in Milan from the workshop of Agostino Busti, which despite never being completed and assembled remains a key work in art history, and especially French Renaissance art, with (as planned) classicising relief panels of his campaigns around the base of the sarcophagus, surmounted by a more traditional recumbent effigy. Most of the pieces are on display in the Castello Sforzesco.

== Ancestors ==
Ancestors of Gaston of Foix, Duke of Nemours

8. John I, Count of Foix
4. Gaston IV, Count of Foix
9. Joan d'Albret
2. John of Foix, Viscount of Narbonne
10. John II of Aragón
5. Eleanor of Navarre
11. Blanche I of Navarre
1. Gaston of Foix, Duke of Nemours
12. Louis I de Valois, Duke of Orléans
6. Charles I, Duke of Orléans
13. Valentina Visconti
3. Marie of Orléans
14. Adolph I, Duke of Cleves
7. Marie of Cleves
15. Marie of Burgundy

== See also ==
- County of Foix
- Portrait of a Clad Warrior

== Sources ==
- Baumgartner, Frederic J. (1996). Louis XII. New York: St. Martin's Press. ISBN 0-312-12072-9.
- Dupuy, Trevor N. (1993). Harper Encyclopedia of Military History. New York: HarperCollins. ISBN 0-06-270056-1.
- Norwich, John Julius (1989). A History of Venice. New York: Vintage Books. ISBN 0-679-72197-5.
- Taylor, Frederick Lewis (1973). The Art of War in Italy, 1494-1529. Westport: Greenwood Press. ISBN 0-8371-5025-6.
- Woodacre, Elena (2013). The Queens Regnant of Navarre: Succession, Politics, and Partnership, 1274-1512. Palgrave Macmillan.
