= Giulio Cantalamessa =

Italian painter and art critic

Giulio Cantalamessa (1 April 1846 – 12 September 1924) was an Italian painter and art critic.

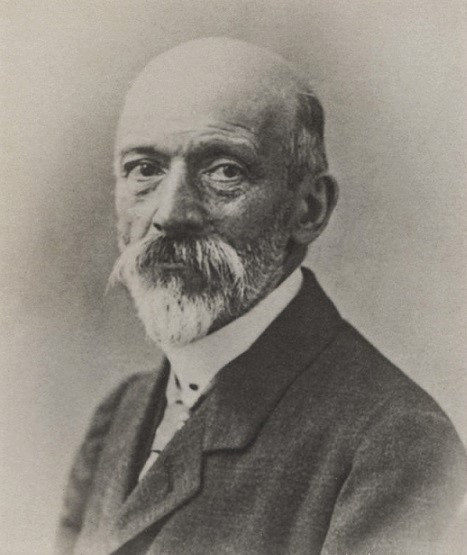
Giulio Cantalamessa

== Biography ==
He was born in Ascoli Piceno. Against his parents' wishes, he enrolled in the Academy of Fine Arts of Bologna under Antonio Puccinelli. He then worked under Antonio Ciseri in Florence for a year. In 1868, he painted Plauto in atto di scrivere una scena faceta, which won a first prize at the Fermo Exhibition of 1869. In 1871, he moved to Rome. In 1873, he painted Francesco Stabili (Cecco d' Ascoli) for the commune of Ascoli. He also painted a number of religious subjects for churches in the Marche, and portraits. In 1883, his health made him stop painting a large canvas depicting Pope John X fatto strozzare da Marozia nelle prigioni. He went on to become active in inventorizing the galleries in Modena (1894, with help from Corrado Ricci and Adolfo Venturi), Venice, as well as the Galleria Borghese in Rome.

Late in life, and despite illness, Cantalamessa examined the Isleworth Mona Lisa and was reported to have said of it: "This is the best Mona Lisa that I have seen except the Louvre, which was in my hands for nearly two months. It is undoubtedly from Leonardo's studio, but I cannot give a further opinion. For this picture documentary evidence is of primary importance because the Mona Lisa in the Louvre has been there so long".
