= Santa Maria della Carità, Brescia =

Church in Brescia, Italy

Coordinates: 45.5394795°N 10.2235833°E

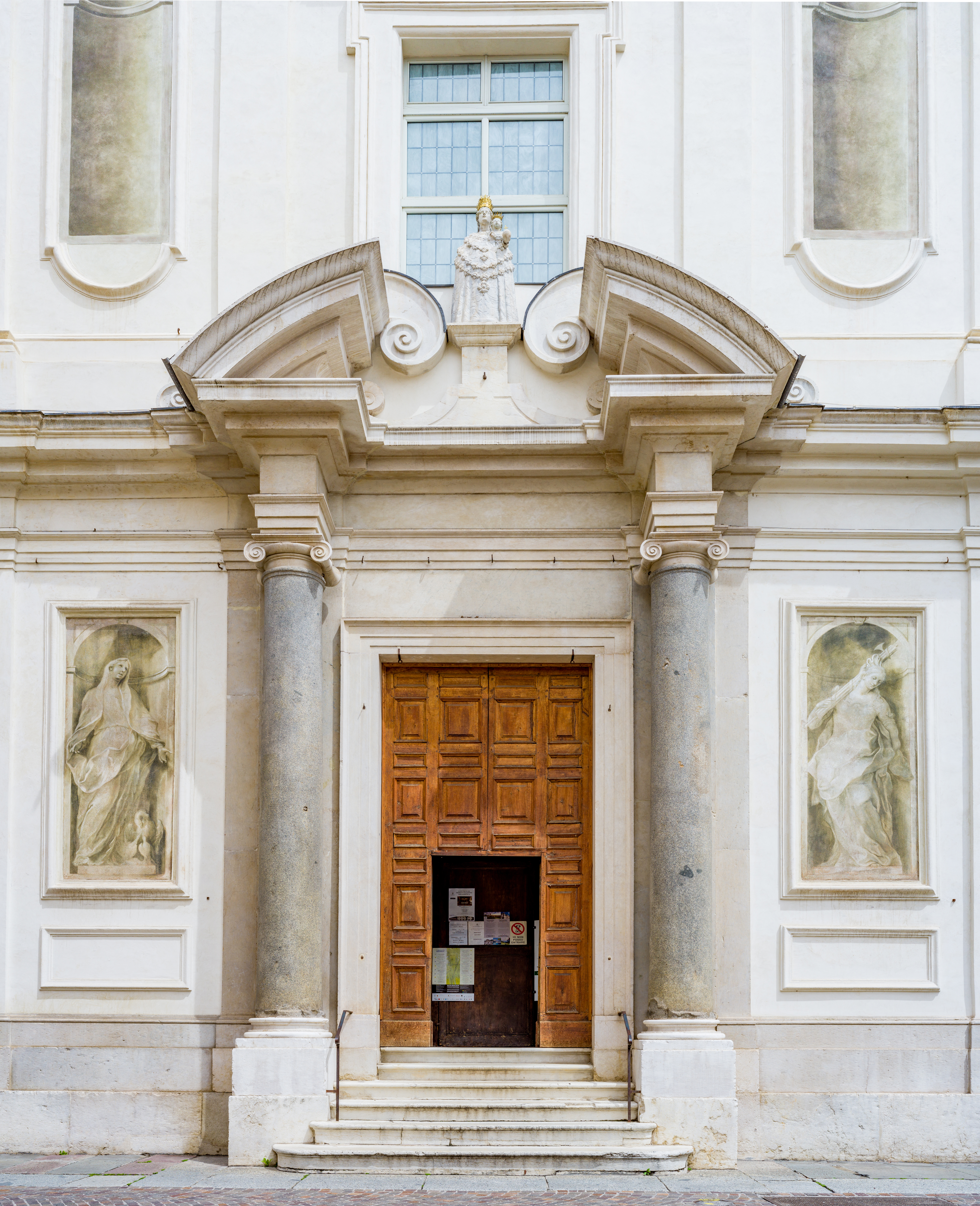
Detail of the facade with two grisaille by Enrico Albrici.

Santa Maria della Carità or just known as the Carità, or the church of the Buon Pastore, is a Baroque-style, Roman Catholic church located on Via dei Musei corner via Rosa in Brescia, region of Lombardy, Italy.

== History ==
It is stated that a wealthy patron, Laura Gambara, erected both the monastery and church of the Carita from 1481 to 1531, and a convent to shelter repentant fallen women or prostitutes, known as convertite. However, the church we see today was replaced in 1640, designed by Agostino Avanzo, and consecrated in 1655. The portal has two columns of Egyptian marble, spolia from a Roman temple, and moved here from the Paleochristian basilica of San Pietro de Dom that was demolished in the 17th century.

The interior has an octagonal layout and is rich with baroque decoration in polychrome marble and stucco. The 15th-century fresco of the Madonna della Carità at the main altar was once present in the Monastery of San Girolamo.

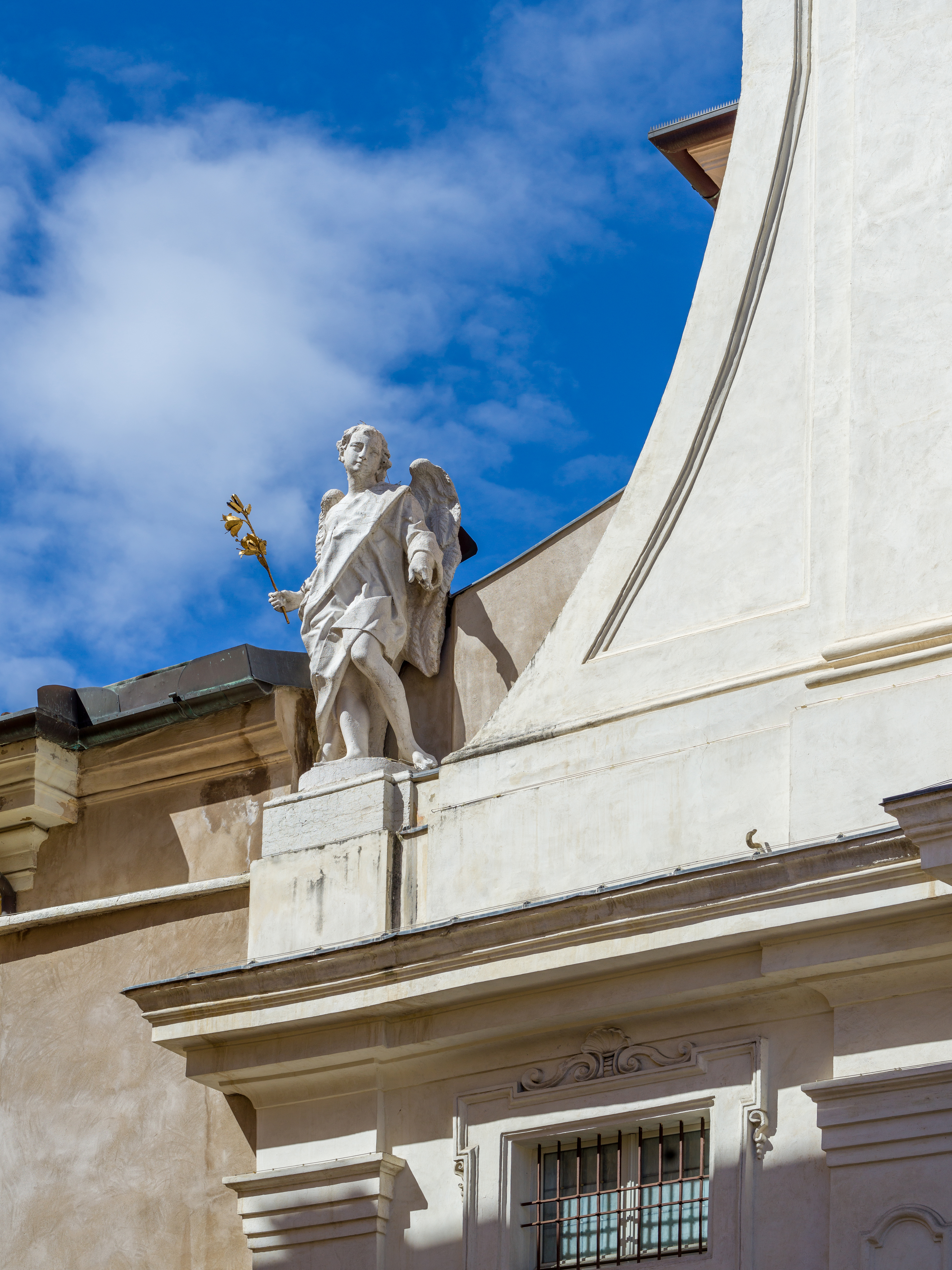
Angel with palm

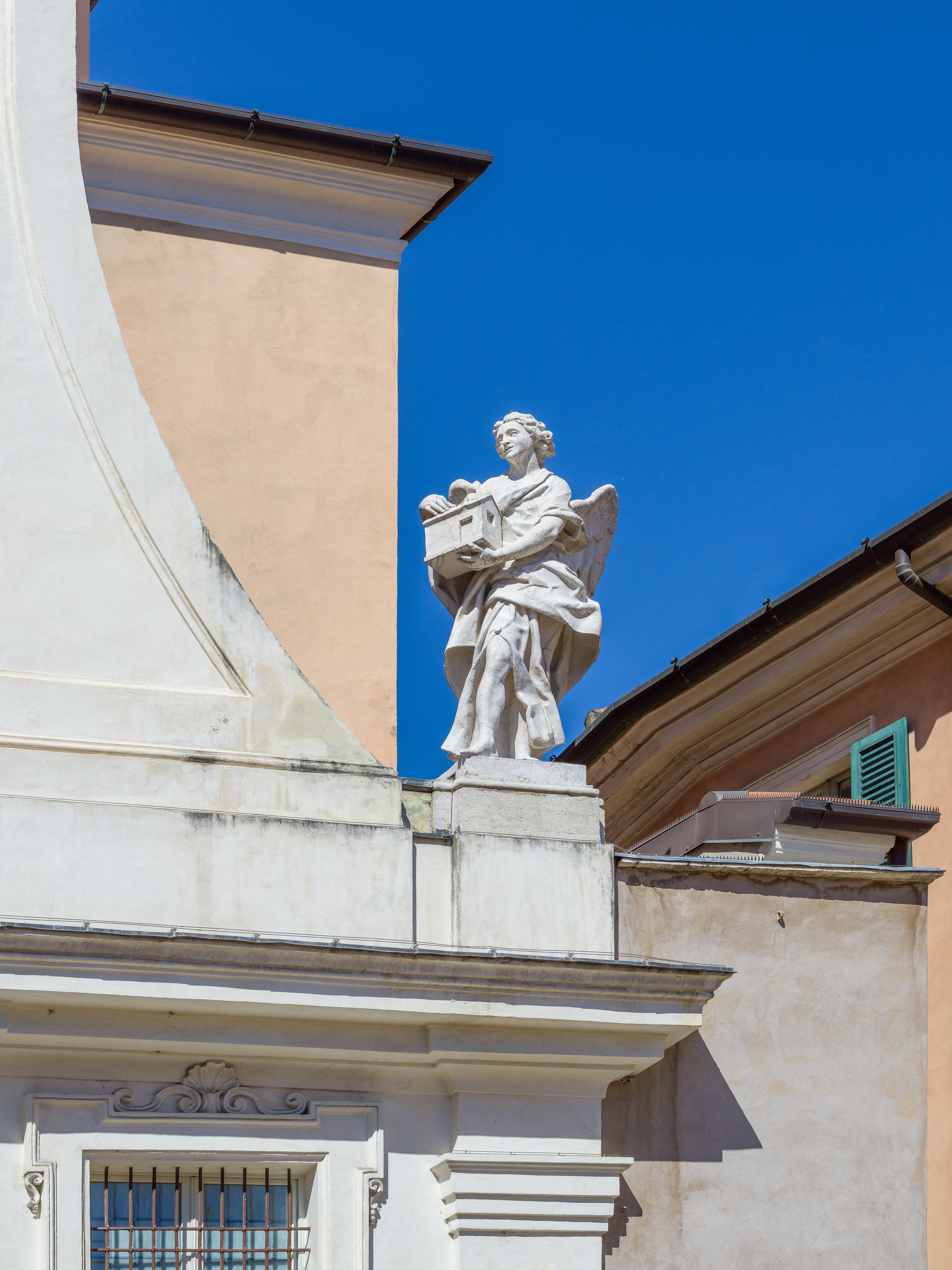
Angel with house of Loreto

An inventory from 1826, recalls quadratura frescoes on the walls by Giuseppe Orsoni, with figures by Bernardino Boni painted in the lunettes under the cupola depicting the Life of the Virgin. Luigi Vernazal, Luigi Molinari, and Ferdinando Cairo painted the area of the dome. The paintings depict the mysteries of the life of the Virgin. A chapel on the left has a canvas by Antonio Gandino depicting the Magadalen. On the right is an altarpiece depicting St Sebastian, St Antony, and St Roch by Francesco Paglia. The church once had a model, built in 1640, of the Santa Casa at the Basilica of Loreto. The church facade roofline has statues by Antontio Ferretti and Alessandro Calegari (the son of Santo Calegari).
