= Santa Maria Lacrimosa degli Alemanni =

Church in Bologna, Italy

Coordinates: 44.487311°N 11.3651°E

Santa Maria Lacrimosa degli Alemanni is a small church and sanctuary, built during the Renaissance era, and located on Via Mazzini number 65 in central Bologna, Italy.

== History ==
Originally sandwiched between the no longer-extant parish church of Santa Maria degli Alemanni and a still-active monastery of Carmelite nuns, Visitazione di Santa Maria, the sanctuary was built to house an icon of the Lacrimose (crying) Virgin that had been painted on a wall at the site. The portico of the church was originally commissioned by the Bolognese Senate in 1539, and the columns are adorned with the symbol of the Senate. By the 1600s, the sanctuary was attached to Carmelite nuns who constructed the adjacent convent. The present church was extensively refurbished over the centuries. Between 1619 and 1625, the chapels of the Saints Teresa and Joseph were built. Among the architects involved at this time was Floriano Ambrosini. In 1690, the polychrome marble Chapel of the Holy Family was completed, designed by Ferdinando Bibiena. In the 18th-century, Alfonso Torreggiani reconstructed one of the chapels. In 1797, the Napoleonic authorities closed the convent and sanctuary. Two of the altarpieces, an Assumption of the Virgin by Lorenzo Sabbatini and a Madonna degli Scalzi (1590) by Ludovico Carracci, were looted to France.

In 1808, the archbishop of Bologna, Cardinal Carlo Oppizzoni, closed and sold of the Alemanni church, and instead made the sanctuary the local parish. The Alemanni church, once named either for German students at the University of Bologna housed at a local hostel, or perhaps for being the site of worship for members of a Teutonic Order. Only the belltower of the Alemanni church remains. The sanctuary was renamed the church of Santa Maria Lacrimosa degli Alemanni.

In the interior on the right, the Bibiena Chapel has an altarpiece of a Holy Family by Gioacchino Pizzoli. There are also altarpieces by Marcantonio Franceschini (St John of the Cross); Domenico Maria Canuti (St Teresa); and Giacinto Garofalini. The church once held a wooden crucifix by Alessandro Algardi, and a copy of the Virgin of St Luke by Guido Reni.

== Links ==
- Parish website
