= Enrico Albrici =

Italian painter (1714–1775)

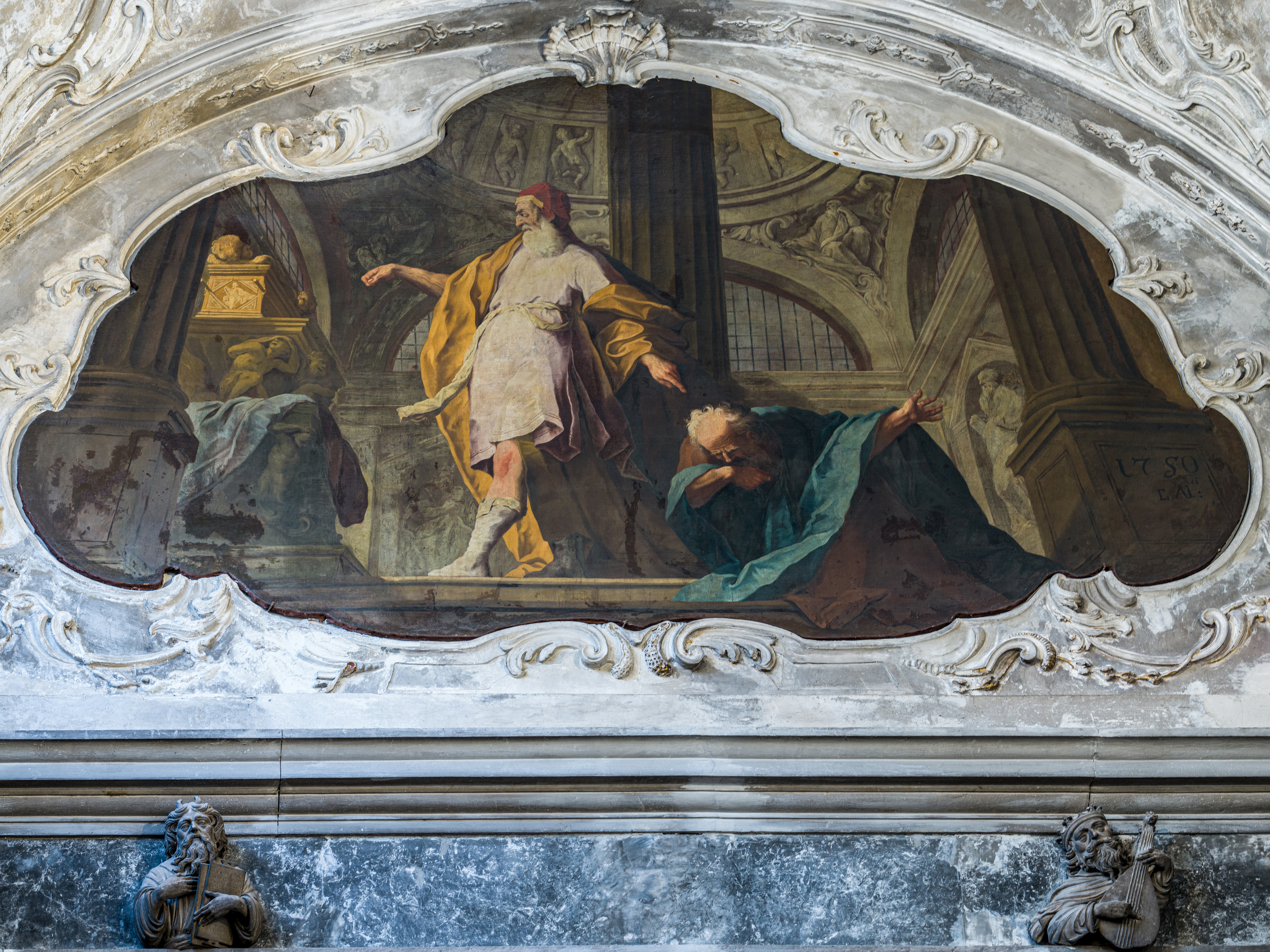
Lunette painting (oil on canvas) dated and signed “1750 E Al:” (Enrico Albrici), representing the parable of the Pharisee and the Publican. Santa Maria dei Miracoli, Brescia

Enrico Albrici (1714–1775) was an Italian painter of the late Baroque. His surname is alternatively spelled or Alberici or Albrizzi or Albricci.

He was born at Vilminore di Scalve in province of Bergamo, and was a pupil of Ferdinando del Cairo of Brescia, under whom he studied three years. He painted for the churches and buildings of Brescia, Bergamo, and the villages in the Valle di Scalve. He painted a Woman of Samaria, a Parable of the Pharisee and the Publican, a Raising of Lazarus, a Prodigal Son and a Good Shepherd for the church Santa Maria dei Miracoli at Brescia. He also painted monochrome paintings for the facade of Charity and Virtue

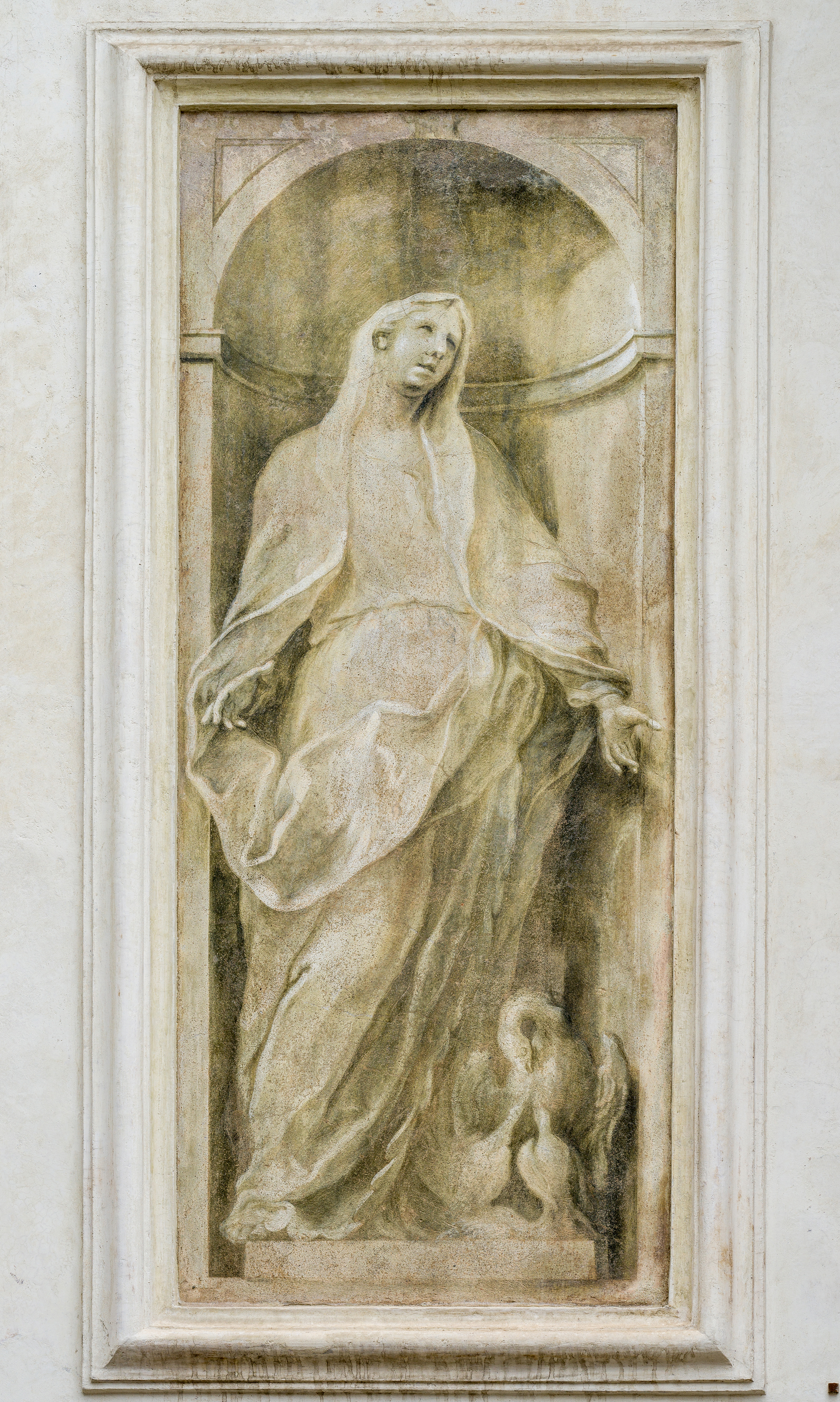
Charity, facade fresco, at Santa Maria della Carità in Brescia (At lower right corner, bird cuts itself, in order to feed blood to offspring)

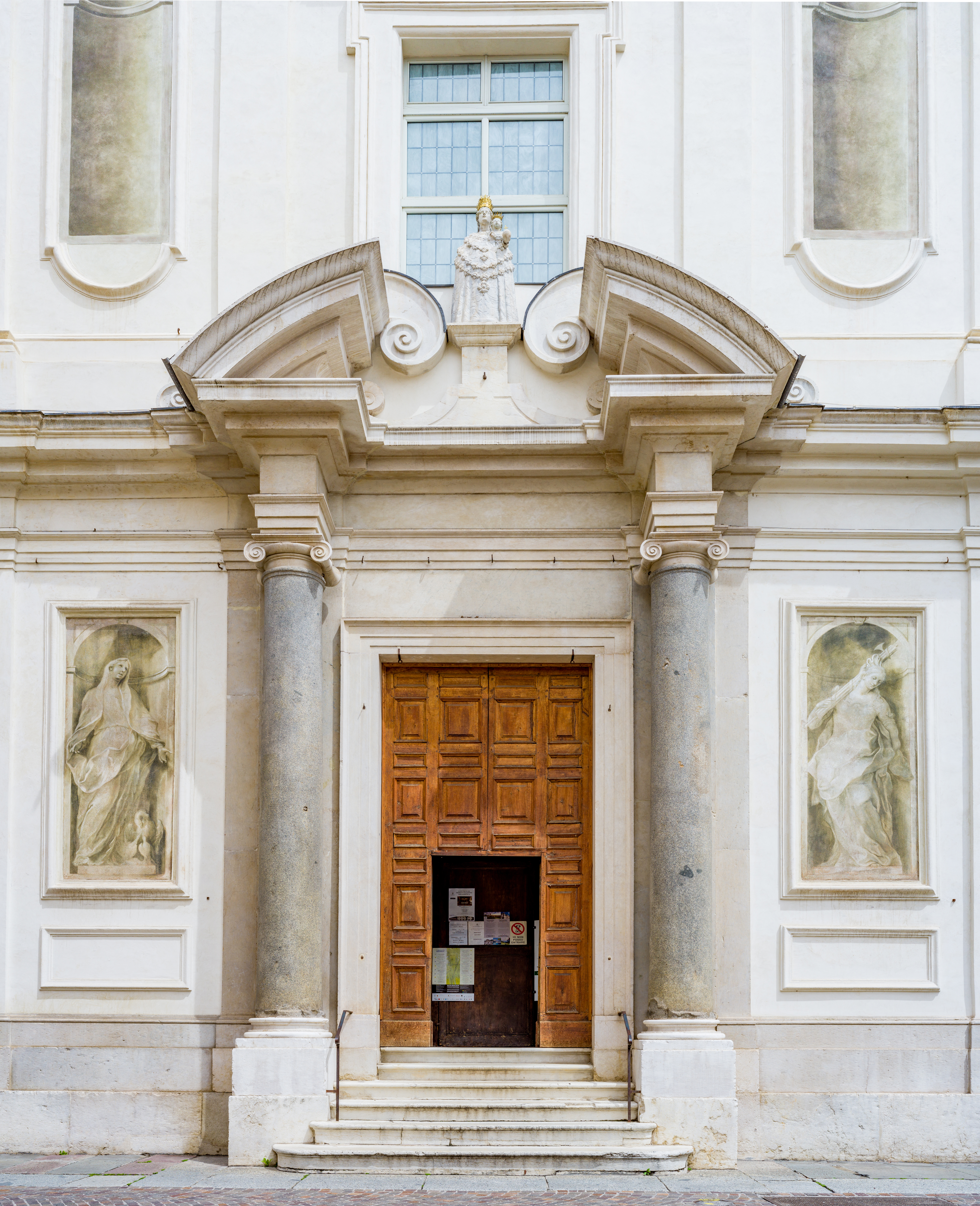
Portal and frescos by Enrico Albrici of the Santa Maria della Carità church in Brescia.

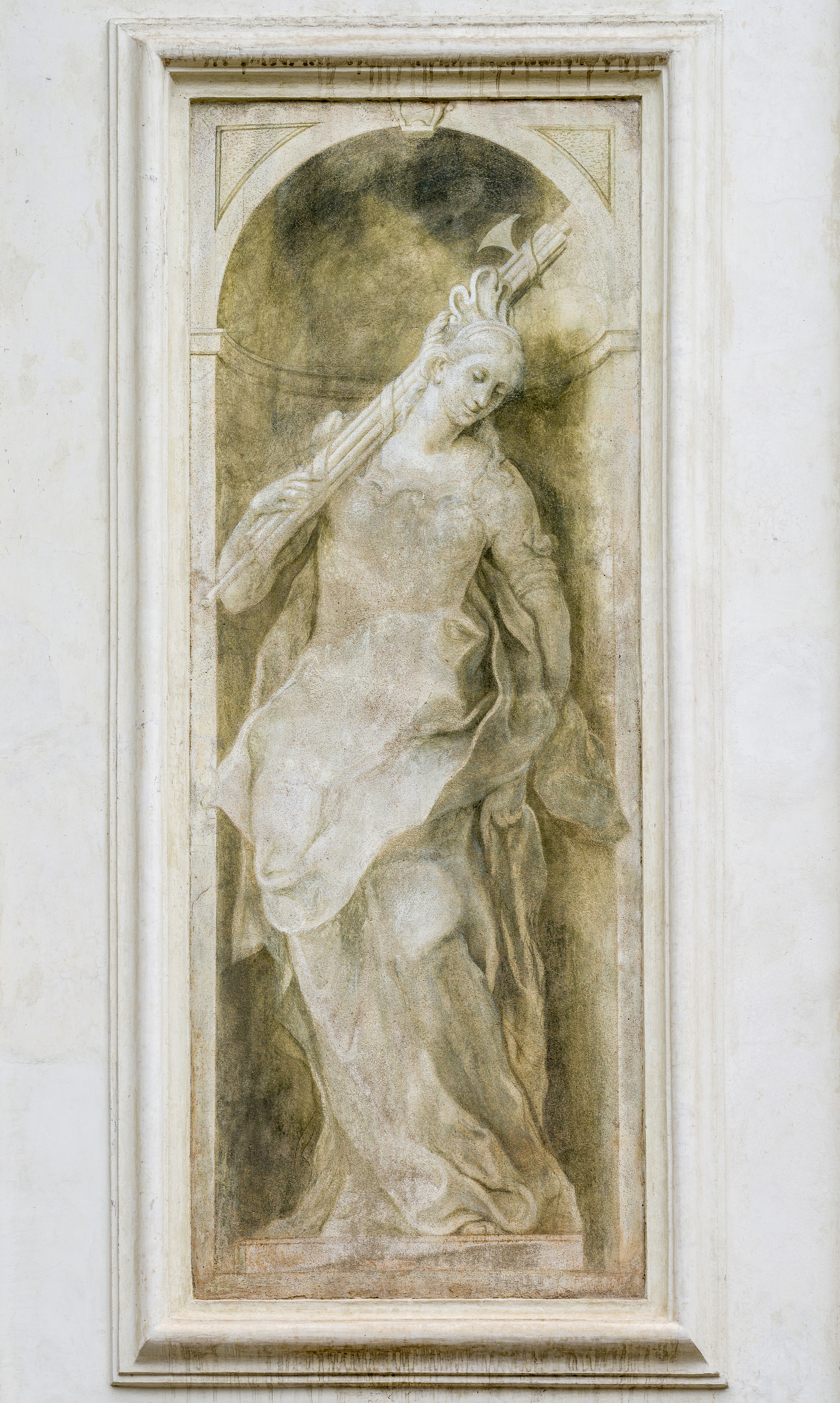
Allegoric figure with fasces in a grisaille fresco by Albrici on the facade of the Santa Maria della Carità church in Brescia

The fresco paintings above were traditional for a serious late Baroque artist; on the other hand, in private commissions, Enrico was a follower of an idiosyncratically jocose and Bamboccianti style fostered by Faustino Bocchi. Both Bocchi and Albrici are now best known for his peculiar paintings of hordes of dwarfs engrossed in daily activities or in farcical epic gestures. The critic Scotti describes him as one that "lowers art to a new grade and wield the brush to draw monstrous dwarfs, gnomes and grotesque animals, witches with Lilliputian bodies, but hands and heads of giants. With (Albrici), genre painting descends into childish caricature, which though it sometimes has certain salacious spiciness and rusticity (montanita), it never gains the vigor of true and satisfying satire".
