= Il Fiammenghino =

The term il Fiammenghino translates it the Flemish man, referring to someone from the medieval region of Flanders. Among those with this nickname were:

- Giovanni Mauro della Rovere, painter
- Angelo Everardi, painter
