= Maestro della Fertilità dell'Uovo =

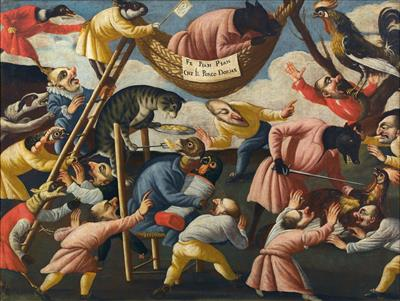
Grotesque scene with animals and stylised figures

Maestro della Fertilità dell'Uovo or Master of the Fertility of the Egg is the name given to a yet to be identified painter active in the second half of the 17th and early 18th century in Brescia. The name is based on a work entitled La fertilità dell' Uovo (The Fertility of the Egg), which depicts dwarfs, geese and lobsters hatching eggs and is in the collection of the Milwaukee Art Museum.

The art historian Mariolina Olivera was the first to isolate a group of works by this master in her 1990 monograph Faustino Bocchi e l'arte di figurar pigmei. She placed the master in the circle of Faustino Bocchi, an artist active in Brescia around the same time and known for his genre paintings with dwarfs. The master’s oeuvre distinguishes itself from Bocchi’s more dreamlike work through its biting, satirical edge.

== Identification ==
The identity of the Master of the Fertility of the Egg has yet to be determined. Some art historians have suggested he was Bernardino Dehò (1675-1717) from Cremona while others have pointed at Angelo Esseradts, known as 'il Fiammingo' (the Fleming), whose name was also Italianised as Everardi. Everardi was Bocchi’s teacher and introduced the bizarre and grotesque elements of Flemish art to Brescia.

== Work ==
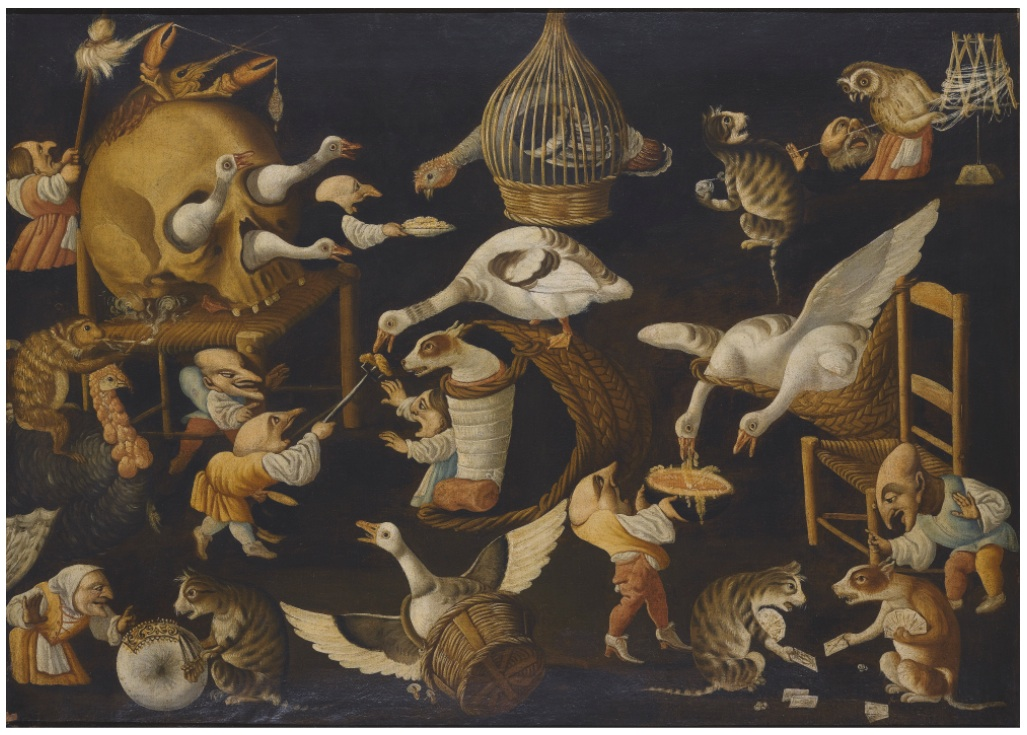
A grotesque scene with animals playing and a dog wrapped in swaddling clothes

The works of this master typically depict grotesque figures (usually dwarfs) and animals engaging in various human activities. The works generally ignore space and are characterized by strong foreshortening. The figures are often portrayed in profile and stand out against the dark, mostly flat backgrounds. This gives them the impression of being cut out.

The persons and animals in the compositions engage in disorganised actions and reactions. The compositions are full of absurd and grotesque elements and it is often difficult to make out what exactly is going on. The master’s raucous style appears to constitute some form of 'moral zoology'. The absurd characters are possibly intended to show the madness of the human condition, and the vanity and ridiculousness of life.

The paintings usually include a banner with a mysterious saying that purportedly explains the subject of the composition. Of a pair of paintings sold at Sotheby’s (27–29 January 2005, New York, lot 369A) one is inscribed Son Capporal Dei Matti Ch osseruo beni patti (I am corporal of the fools that well observes the rules) while the other is inscribed Assai Ben Balla A chi fortuna Suona (He dances well enough who fortune plays for).

The Ruzhnikov Collection holds a triptych by this artist, which depicts a dreamlike world in which the natural order has been overturned. The work contains the artist's trademark assemblage of fantastical figures, each apparently representing a failed attempt to explain the world through astrology or mysticism. For instance, in the first one a pig is identified as an astrologer. The work's intent may have been to satirize the credulousness of people who believe the persons spreading these mystical ideas.

== The triptych in the Ruzhnikov Collection ==
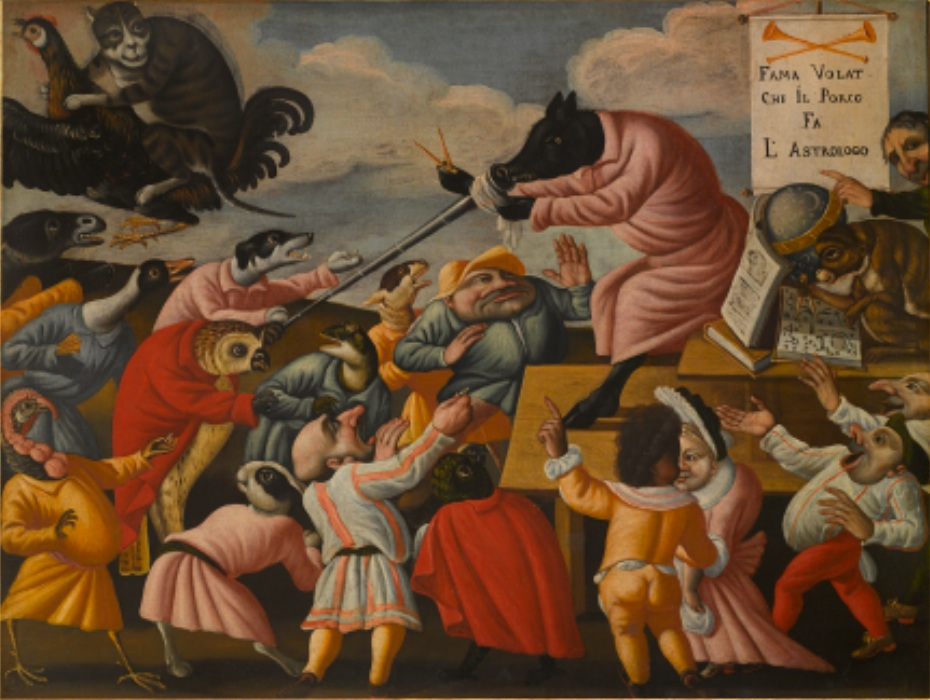

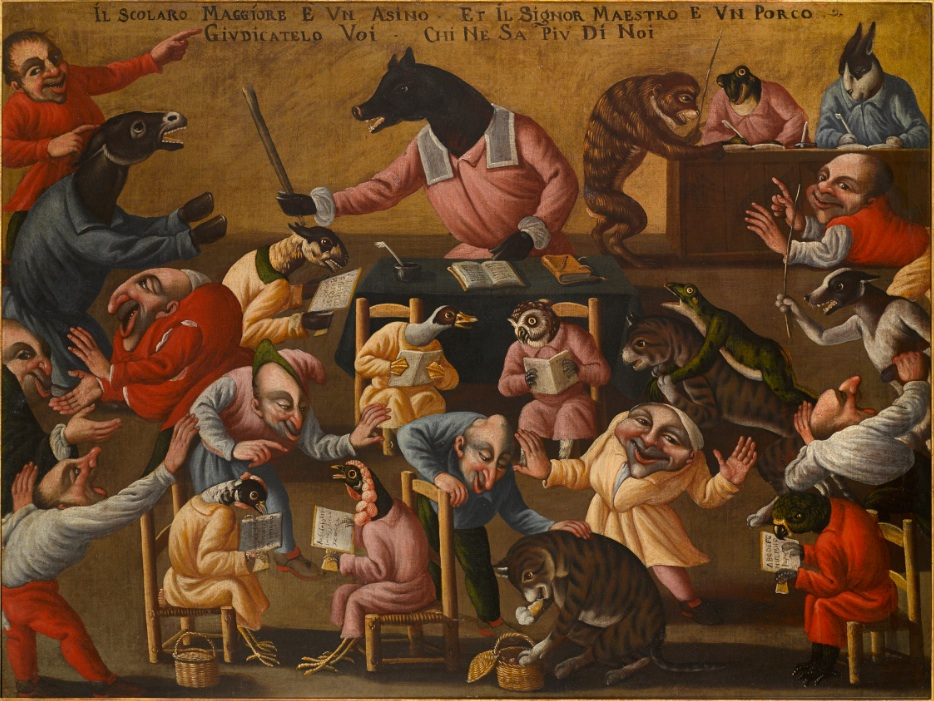

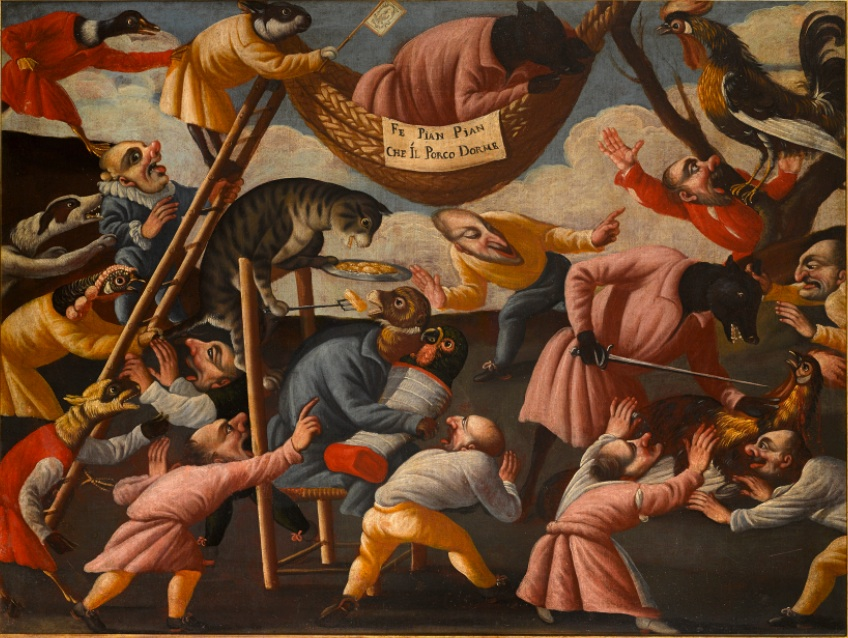
