= San Gaetano, Brescia =

Church building in Brescia, Italy

Coordinates: 45°31′59″N 10°13′42″E

San Gaetano
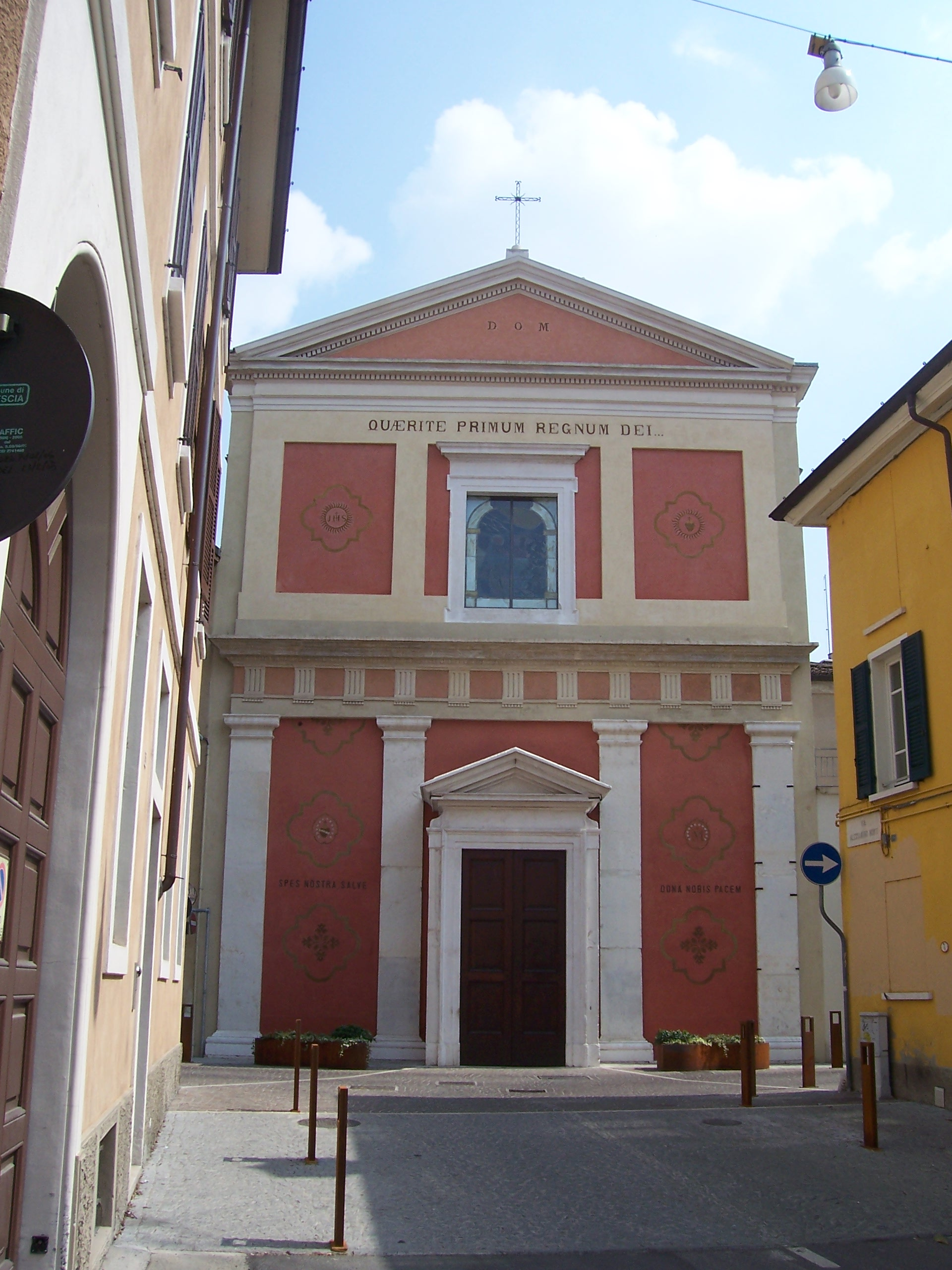

Religion
- Affiliation: Roman Catholic
- Province: Brescia

Location
- Location: Brescia, Italy
- Interactive map of San Gaetano

Architecture
- Architects: Giulio Todeschini and Agostino Avanzo
- Type: Baroque Interior
- Groundbreaking: 1588
- Completed: 1663

The church of San Gaetano is an ancient church located on Via Calegari at the intersection of Via Monti in Brescia.

By the 1600s, it became attached to priests of the order of St. Phillip Neri, under whom it was known as Santa Maria della Purificazione. In 1691, it was acquired by the Theatine order and the named was changed to San Gaetano, the founder of their order. In the late 1800s, the church was transferred to the Franciscan order, with whom it is still associated. The original building was guided by Giovanni Todeschini, while the later baroque reconstruction in by 1663 by Agostino Avanzo.

While the exterior is simple and sober, the interior is highly decorated with a profusion of stucco iconography and reliefs by Andrea Colomba and fresco medallions and stories by Grazio Cossali. The Interior contains canvases by Cossali, Alessandro Maganza, and Giovanni Battista Pittoni (Coming of St Andrew of Avellino in first chapel on right). The church contain brilliantly painted frescoes completed in 1745-1759 by Pietro Scalvini (ceiling Assumption of the Virgin), Antonio Paglia, Andrea Nannini, and the Parisian painter Luigi da Vernassal. The present refurbished organ was constructed by members of the Tamburini family.

The interior contained a painting of St Ursula and the Virgins (early 17th century) by Antonio Bonardi.
