= Agostino Avanzo =

Italian architect

Agostino Avanzo or Avanzi (Brescia, 1582 - 1663) was an Italian architect. He was born in Brescia, and he was active there in the building or reconstruction of the churches of the Carità, San Gaetano, San Giorgio, and the oratory of San Rocco. He also was involved in work in the Duomo of Chiari. He is also reported to have painted, along with Camillo Rama, the frescoes of the Life of Saint Catherine in the church of San Domenico. Brescia.
