= Bernardino Bono =

Italian painter

Bernardino Bono or Boni (died 1774) was an Italian painter of the late-Baroque period, active in Northern Italy.

He was born in Brescia and putatively a scholar of the Bolognese Giacomo Antonio Boni. It is unclear if they were relatives. He is documented to have painted sacred subjects, including altarpieces and frescoes in the churches of Santi Pietro e Paolo, Pregasso di Marone; the parish church of Cailina; and the Chiesa della Carità, Brescia (1729–1748).
