= Giacinto Garofalini =

Italian painter

Giacinto Garofalini (1661–1723) was an Italian painter of the Baroque period, active mainly in Bologna. He was initially a pupil of Donato Creti, and later studied under the painter Marcantonio Franceschini. He was also referred to as Garofolini by Luigi Lanzi. He was a professor at the Accademia Clementina, where he taught figure painting.

He married a niece of Franceschini's wife. Together with a fellow pupil, Ferdinando Cairo, Garofalini painted the vault of the Church of Sant'Antonio in Brescia, as well as several side altarpieces. He painted two large canvases for the Church of the Scalzi Priests. With Luca Antonio Bistega, a painter of quadratura, he decorated the chapel of San Tommaso del Mercato. He also worked on the Sanctuary of Santa Maria Lacrimosa (to which later was added the tag degli Alemanni).
