= Angelo Everardi =

Italian painter

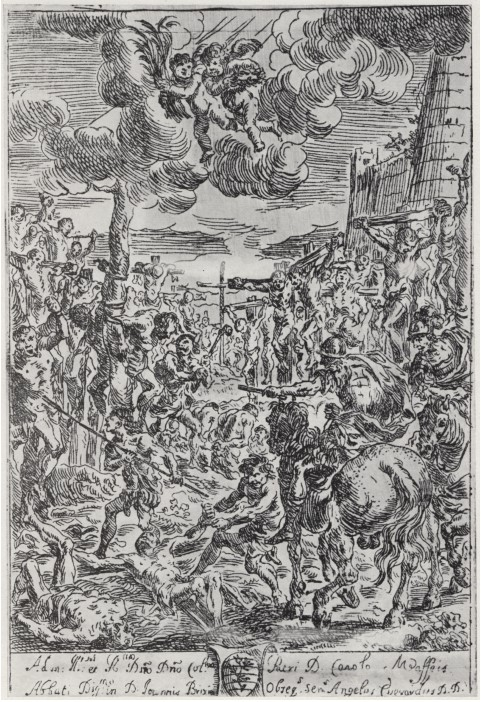
Crucifixion of the ten thousand Martyrs on Mount Ararat

Angelo Everardi (5 August 1647 – 1678) was a painter and printmaker active in Brescia in the second half of the 17th century. No paintings have been attributed to him with certainty. He is reported to have been a painter of battle scenes, Bambocciate, i.e. low life genre scenes as well as of history paintings.

== Life ==
Angelo Everardi was born in Brescia as the son of a Giovanni (Joan) from Sittard in Flanders (now in the Netherlands) and Vittoria, his second wife. This Flemish origin explains his name 'il Fiammenghino' or Fiammenghino. His father was a "maestro di ruote di archibugio" ("master of the wheels of the arquebus") indicating that he was likely a maker of guns.

He studied in his home town with the Flemish painter Jan de Herdt who was working in Italy at the time and Francesco Monti (il Brescianino). He then went to Rome to further his studies. Here he acquainted himself in particular with the battle scenes of Jacques Courtois. After two years in Rome, he returned to Brescia, having to provide for his family.

Among his pupils were Pompeo Ghiti and Faustino Bocchi (1659–1742). Bocchi painted both battles and genre scenes of dwarves and occasionally other mythical beasts.

He died in Brescia in 1678.

== Work ==
No paintings have been attributed to him with certainty. He is reported to have been a painter of battle scenes and Bambocciate, i.e. low life genre scenes as well as of history paintings. He was highly respected by his contemporaries and his battle scenes were praised as being on the same level as those of Courtois. However, his early death led to his work falling into oblivion.

The only work that can be attributed with certainty to the artist is a print depicting the Crucifixion of the ten thousand Martyrs on Mount Ararat, which was published in the book Il glorioso martirio dei diecimila soldati crocefissi nel monte Ararat dell'Armenia published in Brescia in 1674. The print is signed "Angelus Everardus". The booklet was a devotional libretto with songs on the theme of the Ten thousand martyrs. This is the story about the 10,000 martyrs who were, according to a medieval legend, Roman soldiers who, led by Saint Acacius, converted to Christianity and were crucified on Mount Ararat in Armenia by order of the Roman emperor. The print gives a highly dynamic impression with the figures moving in a geometric and atmospheric perspective space. In the foreground a knight giving orders creates additional dynamic movement in the painting. Possibly because of the similarity of the subject and the proximity in time, many scholars attributed to Everardi the altarpiece of the Crucifixion of the ten thousand martyrs placed on the second altar on the right of the church of San Giovanni Evangelista in Brescia. M. A. Baroncelli rejected the attribution based on the weaknesses of the altarpiece such as a crowding of the nude figures, a coldness and monotony of color and compositional failures in the lower part of the canvas.

Some art historians have suggested that Everardi should be identified with the artist referred to as Maestro della Fertilità dell'Uovo who painted grotesque scenes. The arguments for this suggestion are that Everardi as a Flemish painter was familiar with the Northern tradition of the grotesque and that he trained Faustino Bocchi who is known for his grotesque scenes.
