= Faustino Bocchi =

Italian painter (1659–1742)

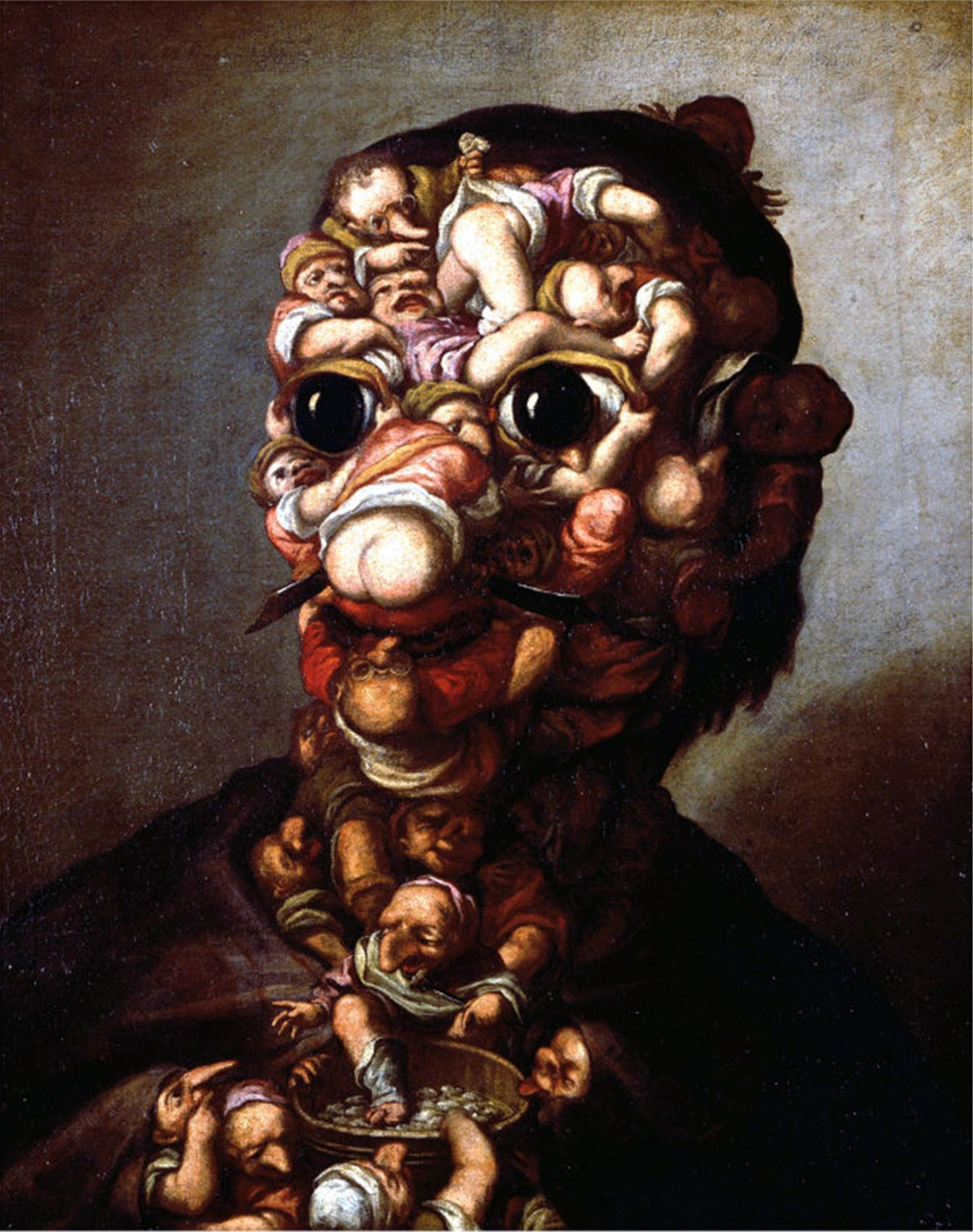
An example of a Bocchi painting

Faustino Bocchi (1659–1742) was an Italian painter, active in Brescia, who specialized in bizarre paintings of dwarfs.

== Early life ==
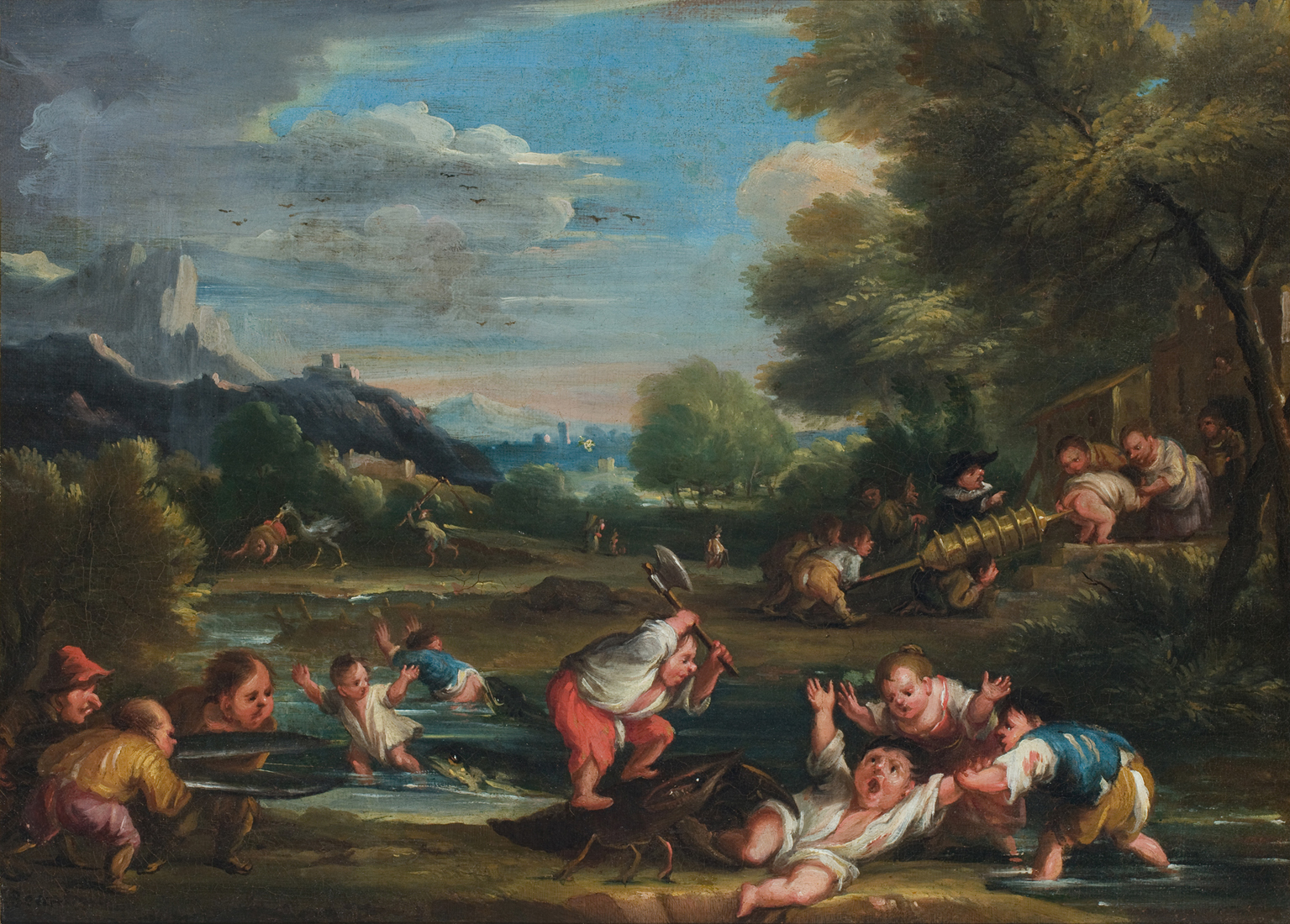
Dwarf attacked by a shrimp and rescued by his companions

He was son of Giacomo and Giulia Faioni, and was born in Brescia on June 17, 1659. It is not known if Bocchi ever moved from Brescia; Carboni, albeit with great uncertainty, cited a stay at the court of Florence, a stay that seems unlikely given the absolute silence of the Atoldi who also cited the three works painted by Bocchi for that court. What is certain is that Bocchi had a quiet life, and his study was presented as a sought-after place for cheerful conversationalists, enlivened by the music of the zither of which he was a good player.

== Career ==
Bocchi was a pupil of Angelo Everardi (il Fiamminghino or Fiammenghino), a figurist, a painter of battles and bambocciate, who instructed him in these three genres; while the document Vinaccesi states that Bocchi was initially formed under Carlo Baciocchi and only later, when he became a friar, passed under Everardi: it was however a period short, completed in the year 1678 with the death of the master.

Bocchi's paintings were generally seen as humorous or satirical, and often scabrous pieces, though some resemble the decorative conceits of Arcimboldo, while others suggest the nightmarish world of Hieronymus Bosch. Cristiani cites this as the "capricious particularity to represent with his master paint-brush: the battles, the fights, the games, the dances, the feasts, and triumphs of the pygmies". By some Bocchi is described as a genre painter of the Bamboccianti, specifically a Bambocciate di nani or arte pigmeo. His paintings were highly prized by Bergamesque collectors such as Giacomo Carrara and Ludovico Ferronati.

Enrico Albricci is said to have been Bocchi's pupil for a spell.

== Death ==
Bocchi died in Brescia on April 27, 1741.

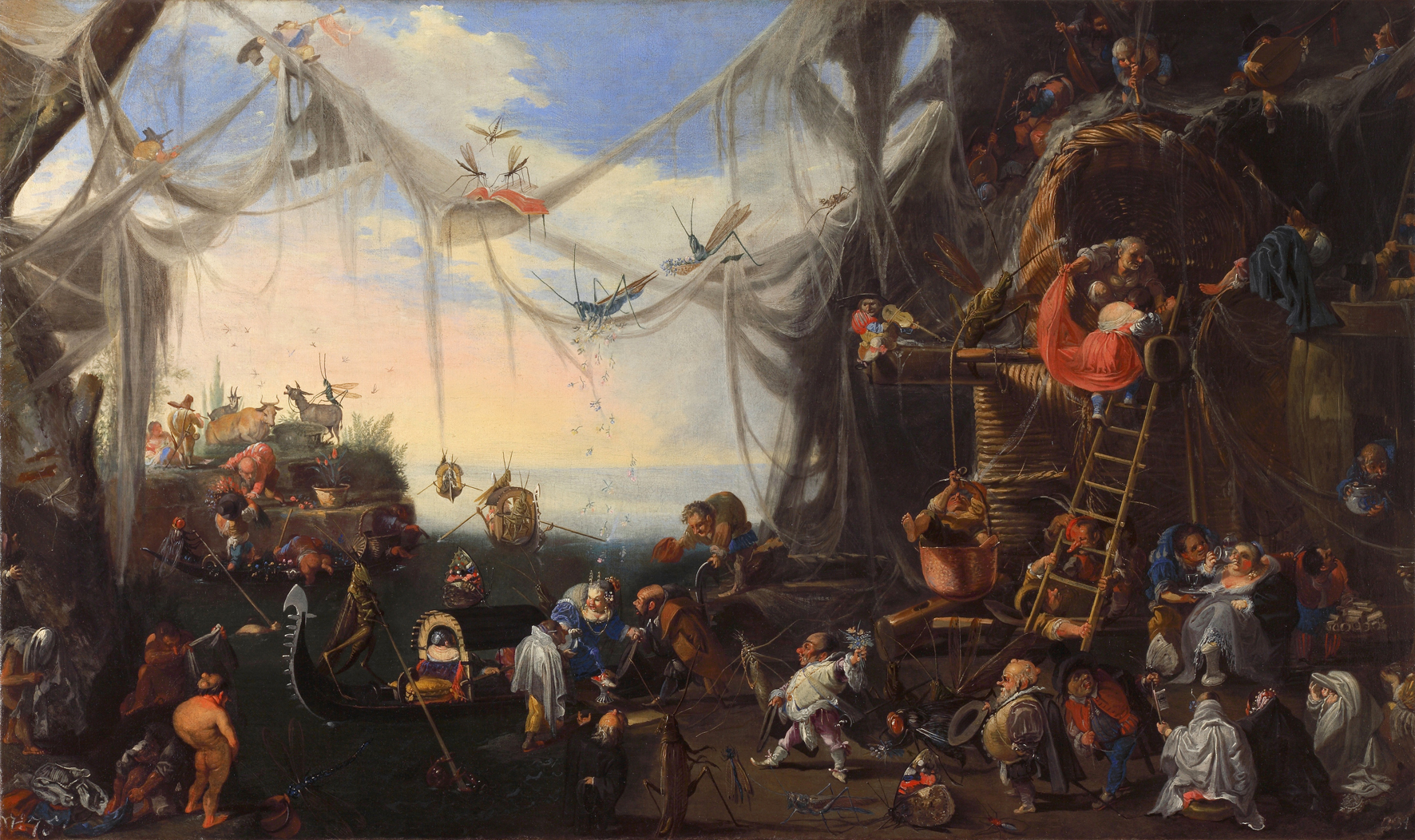
Arrival of the Wife
