= Madonna degli Scalzi with Saints Francis and Jerome =

Painting by Ludovico Carracci

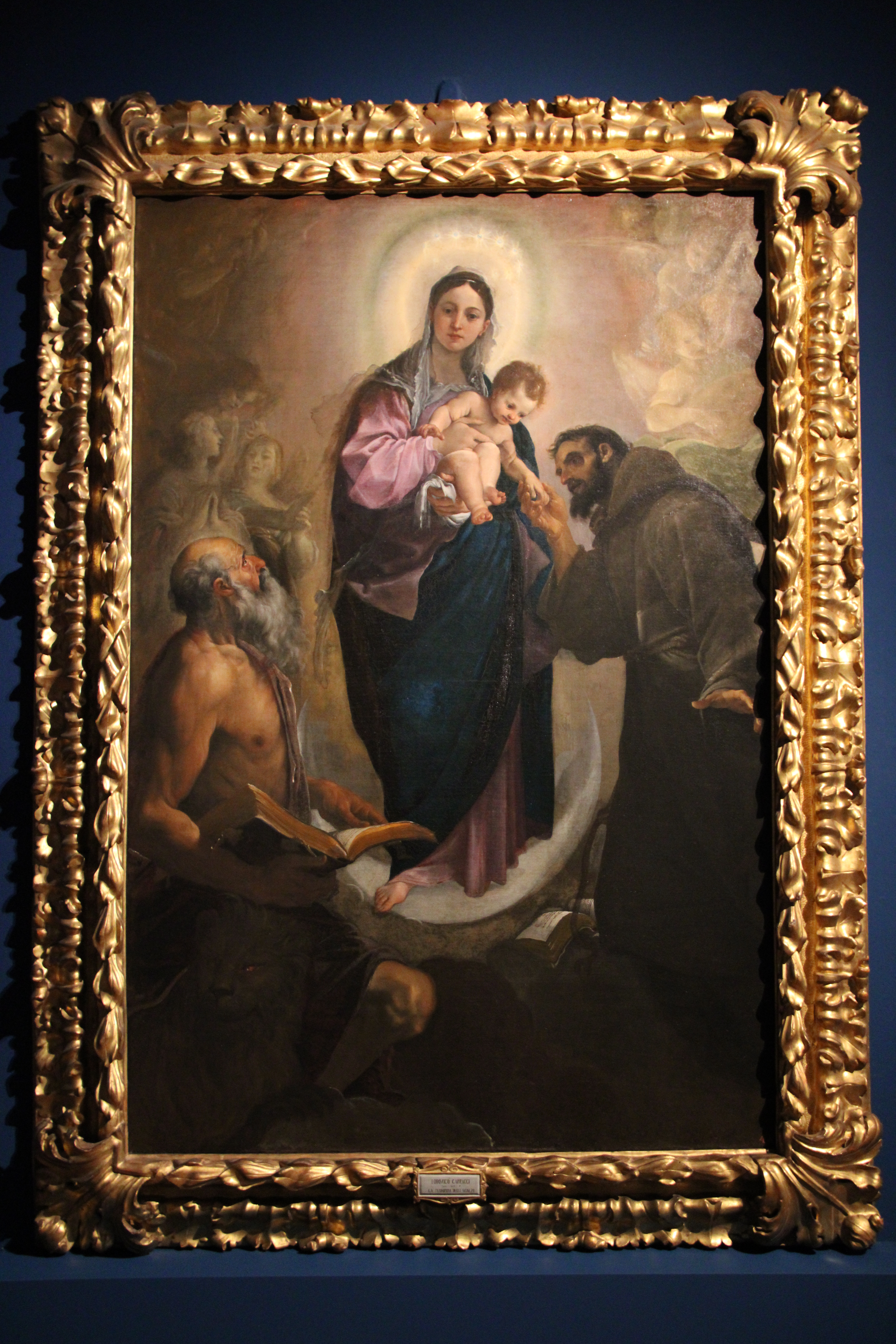
Madonna degli Scalzi with Saints Francis and Jerome (c. 1590) by Ludovico Carracci

The Madonna degli Scalzi with Saints Francis and Jerome is an oil-on-canvas altarpiece by the Italian painter Ludovico Carracci, from c. 1590. It is held in the Pinacoteca Nazionale di Bologna.

== History and description ==
Caracci painted this altarpiece for the Bentivoglio chapel of the church of the Madonna degli Scalzi in Bologna. The arrangement in the painting has some similarities to the painting of Sistine Madonna by Raphael. It depicts the Virgin Mary flanked by St Francis of Assisi on her left, receiving an object from the hand of the infant Jesus, and on her right below holding his open bible, is St Jerome. In the dim foreground of Jerome, sits beside him a lion.

Legend held that Jerome had once plucked a thorn from a lion's foot, and that the lion from there on became his companion. While Jerome does not put down his bible, a book at the feet of Francis is overtaken by the vision of the Madonna. In the background are shadowy monochrome depictions of angels. With a sheer veil on her head, a glowing halo, and a crown of stars, the virgin gazes forward and down, where the visitors to the church would have been. She walks atop a crescent moon, and early depiction of a symbol of her Immaculate Conception.

The Bolognese baroque engraver Flaminio Torre completed an engraving loosely based on the painting.
