= Ferdinando del Cairo =

Italian painter

Ferdinando del Cairo (1666–1748) was an Italian painter of the Baroque period, active in Northern Italy.

== Biography ==
He was born in Casale Monferrato, Savoyard state, and learned the first rudiments of design from his father, an unknown artist. He afterwards became a pupil of Marcantonio Franceschini at Bologna. He painted history, and, in conjunction with Giacinto Garofalino, was employed to paint the ceiling of the church of Sant' Antonio at Brescia. He died at Genoa. He had an elder brother, Giuseppe (or Guglielmo) (1656–1682) who was also a painter.
