= Ark of San Tiziano =

Marble tomb by the Sanmicheli studio

The Ark of San Tiziano
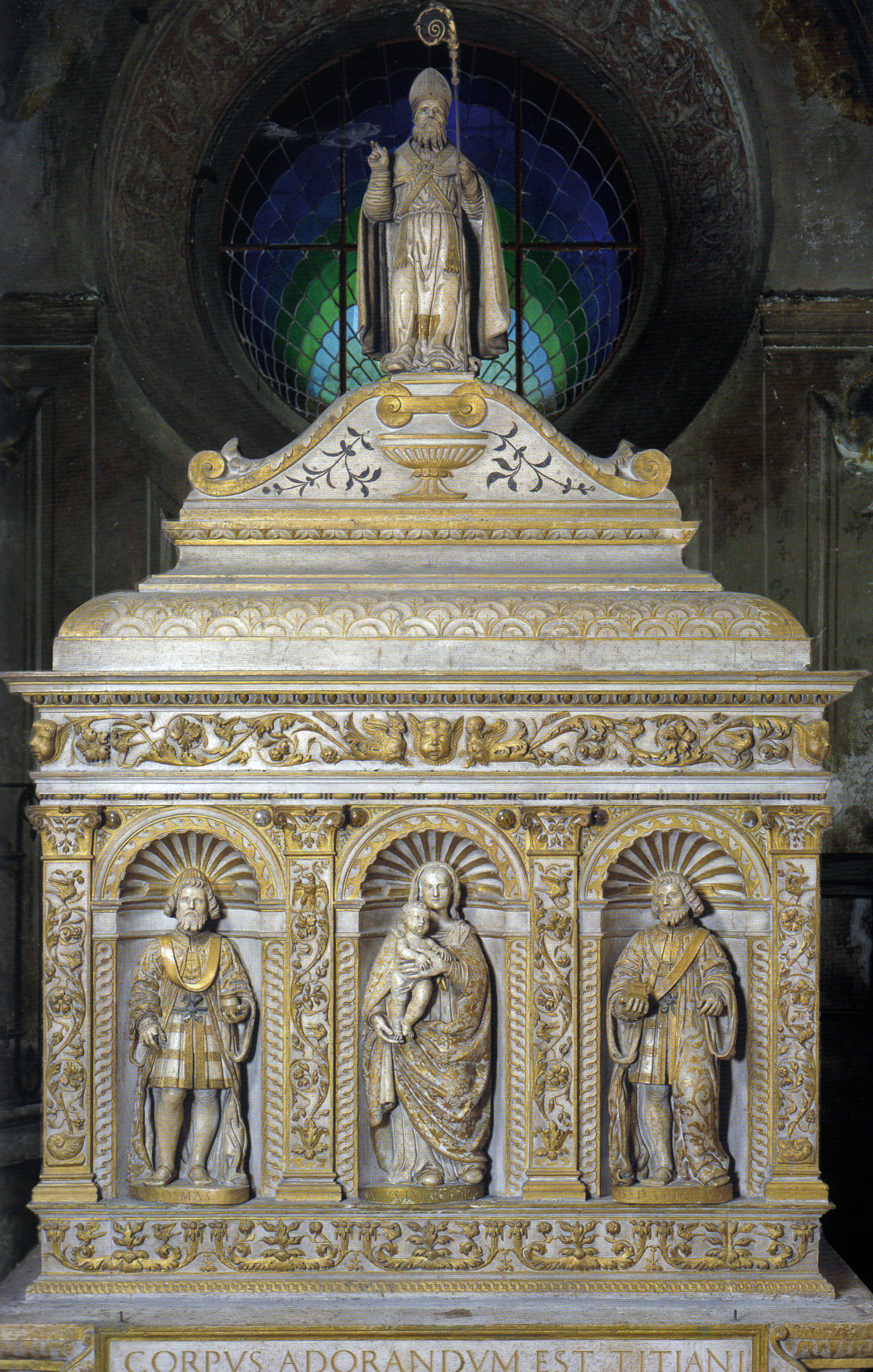
- Artist: Sanmicheli studio
- Year: 1505
- Medium: Marble
- Movement: Renaissance
- Location: Church of Saints Cosma and Damiano, Brescia

The Ark of San Tiziano is a marble tomb attributed to the Sanmicheli studio. Finished in 1505, it is located in the Church of the Saints Cosma and Damiano in Brescia, in the chapel dedicated to these saints.

== History ==
San Tiziano, bishop of Brescia between 526–540, was initially buried in the old church of the Saints Cosma and Damiano, which stood until the end of the thirteenth century in front of the Brolleto. In 1298, at the behest of Berardo Maggi and as part of the expansion of the public palazzo, the church and the attached nunnery were demolished to create an urban space west of the Broletto, which currently constitutes the northern end of the Piazza del Duomo. The church and the nunnery were built at the western edge of the inhabited centre of the city, but within the city walls built by Alberico da Gambara between 1237-1239. At this time, the bishop's relics were either lost or forgotten, and thus not transferred to the new building.

In 1490, during the episcopate of Paolo Zane, the abbess of the nunnery had a revelation of the burial place of the relics. According to legend, the subsequent excavation proved her dream to be precise. The saint's sarcophagus was probably not the original, but likely dated to the 12th century. The idea of a new monumental ark for the relics then came about, and within fifteen years, the funerary monument was installed in the chapel on the left of the presbytery of the Cosma and Damiano church. An inscription MDV (1505) appears on the base, indicating the date of installation. The translation of the body of the saint is also recorded in the Brescian state archives. The tomb was ostensibly subject to some further work, as MDXXIX (1529) appears on the back of the moulding. The extent of the works, however, is questioned.

The new sepulchral ark survives intact to the present day. The twelfth century sarcophagus, though, was preserved in its original form only till 1885, when Antonio Tagliaferri, an architect, reused it along with other stone materiel from the same monastery to create an ornamental fountain, located in the eastern part of piazzetta Tito Speri, and known as the Fountain of San Tiziano.

== Description ==
In the lower part of the sepulchre, four pilasters, richly carved with tendrils, flowers and birds, delimit three niches with a shell cover, within which, from right to left, Saint Damiano, a Madonna and Child with Saint Cosma are depicted. Above it develops the elaborate cover, with a series of mouldings tapered up to the cymatium, which acts as a pedestal for the representation of San Tiziano. The back does not have figured sculptures, but a panel division with mirrors, where the same ornaments of the front are taken up. A refined and precise gilding covers many parts of the ark, in particular the four sculptures with an effective and elegant rendering of the fabrics of the clothes.

== Stylistic assessment and attribution ==
Historically the ark was attributed to more or less anonymous Brescian or Lombard sculptors between the end of the 15th century and the beginning of the following one. In 2007, Vito Zani proposed the attribution of the ark to the Sanmicheli workshop, as part of a series of sculptural works that the family of artists would have made between the 1480s and the early 16th century. These included important works such as the facade of the Church of Santa Maria dei Miracoli, many stone works for the Palazzo della Loggia, most of the sculptures in the Church of San Pietro in Oliveto and other minor but significant artefacts including the architectural members outside the Caprioli Chapel in the Church of San Giorgio.

The ark of San Tiziano stands out for the refined ornamental imprint that characterizes the treatment of the surfaces, exalted above all by the gilding. In particular, however, it is among the very rare Brescian marble works with figurative components that can be placed completely outside the circle of Gasparo Cairano, the main exponent of Brescian Renaissance sculpture between 1490 and 1515. At this point, other than the Sanmicheli workshop, it is difficult to find in Brescia another studio capable of producing works of similar quality. The mirrors on the back of the sepulcher constitute a simplified reproduction of the pronaos of the sanctuary of the Miracles, which has been traced back to the Sanmicheli.

According to the documentary evidence, the only member of the Sanmicheli family to practise figurative work was Matteo Sanmicheli, and to him is attributed the statues on the ark. An affinity between these figures and those of the faces of some of the Apostles along the nave of the church of San Pietro in Oliveto has also been noted. The cycle of twelve statues, likely completed by 1507, is attributed to Gasparo Cairano and company, implying the existence of a subcontract to the Sanmicheli. Matteo Sanmicheli's Piedmontese career began with a statuette in the lost tomb of Maria di Serbia in Casale Monferrato, dated to 1510; this has clear references to figures in the candelabrum of the pilasters in the Cavalli chapel of the San Pietro church, Oliveto, completed in 1508. That chapel, in turn, is informed by the technical and compositional detail of the Sanctuary of the Miracles, detail that continued to be reiterated in Sanmicheli's Piedmontese oeuvre.

The Ark of San Tiziano can also be seen as another example in the competition between Gasparo Cairano's classical style, which had increasingly become popular among Brescian public and private clients, and the Sanmicheli, whose decorative style was out of vogue. Indeed, this ark can be seen as an attempt by Bartolomeo Sanmicheli at the beginning of a new century, to return to artistic prominence. While several commissions, notably the Caprioli chapel and the ornamentation of San Pietro in Oliveto, seem to have been shared by the competitors, Cairano's riposte came in 1508, with the Ark of Sant'Apollonio. His artistic superiority in the eyes of the Brescian state was firmly established, and this probably caused the Sanmicheli to abandon Brescia. They moved to Casale Monferrato, where Bartolomeo died two years later, and Matteo began a new career.

In 2010, Giuseppe Sava reconstructed the figure of Antonio Medaglia, the little-known architect of the church of San Pietro in Oliveto, proposing a catalog of works. In addition to this, Sava detected the hand of yet another artist in a small group of works among the statuettes of the ark of San Tiziano, in two figured rounds in the interiors of Santa Maria dei Miracoli and in the small busts of bishops and the Magdalene on the prospect of the chapel dedicated to San Tiziano in San Pietro in Oliveto. Sava then assigns all these works to a sculptor influenced by Stefano Lamberti, albeit erring in reading the date on the coping of the ark as 1519 instead of 1529. The question of assignment of the work therefore remains open: if it can be postdated to the 1520s, it might be attributable to Lamberti's disciple, in which case at least the statues of the ark would be taken away from Matteo Sanmicheli's oeuvre. The dating of the other works, namely the two roundels and the figures of the chapel of the Magdalene, however remains controversial.

== Bibliography ==
- Braga, Marina; Simonetto, Roberta (2004). "Verso porta San Nazaro". Brescia Città Museo. Brescia: Sant'Eustacchio.
- Sava, Giuseppe (2010). "Antonio Medaglia "lapicida et architecto" tra Vicenza e la Lombardia: il cantiere di San Pietro in Oliveto a Brescia". Arte Veneta (67).
- Zani, Vito (2006). "Sulle tracce dei Sanmicheli a Brescia e Mantova, tra Quattro e Cinquecento". In Ceriana, Matteo (ed.). Tullio Lombardo. Scultore e architetto nella cultura artistica veneziana del Rinascimento, atti del convegno. Venice.
- Zani, Vito (2010). Gasparo Cairano. Roccafranca: La Compagnia della Stampa.
- Zani, Vito (2011). "Maestri e cantieri nel Quattrocento e nella prima metà del Cinquecento". In Terraroli, Valerio (ed.). Scultura in Lombardia. Arti plastiche a Brescia e nel Bresciano dal XV al XX secolo. Milan: Skira.
- Zani, Vito (2012). "Un marmo lombardo del Rinascimento e qualche precisazione sulla scultura lapidea a Brescia tra Quattro e Cinquecento (seconda parte)". Antiqua.
