= Gasparo Cairano =

Italian sculptor (1489–1517)

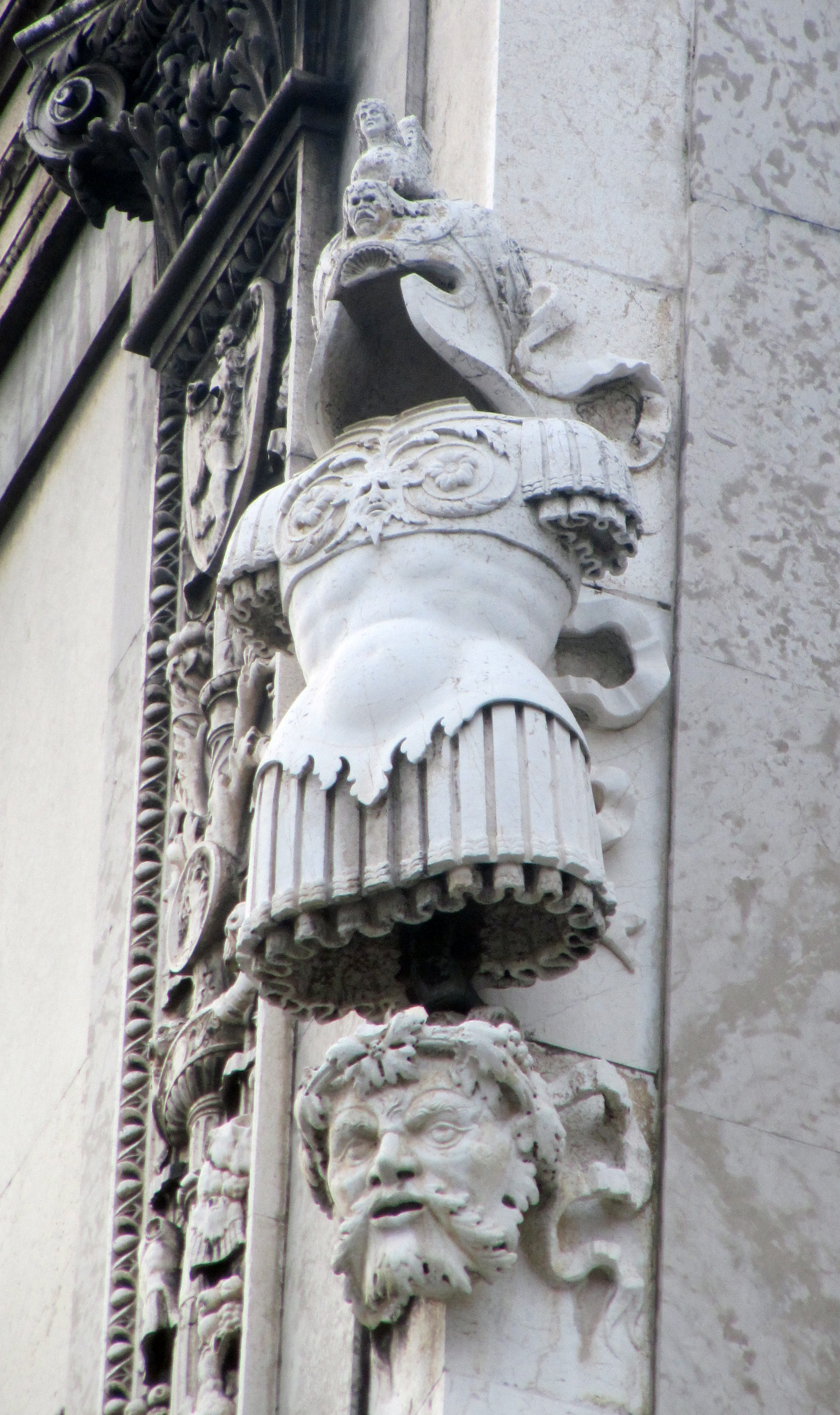
- Trofeo (1499–1500), Loggia palazzo, Brescia, south-east view
- Born: before 1489; Milan or Pieve del Cairo or Cairate
- Died: before 1517; Brescia
- Known for: Sculpture
- Movement: High Renaissance

Gasparo Cairano, also known as Gasparo da Cairano, de Cayrano, da Milano, Coirano, (Note: This variant is not present in historical sources and was introduced in 1963 by Adriano Peroni (see Peroni, pp. 619–887), and accepted as canonical by later researchers (see Zani 2010, p.102, note 85)) and other variations (born Milan or Pieve del Cairo or Cairate, (Note: See note in Boselli, p. 289, regarding a Brescian document of March 1531, where a mention is made of Gasparo's firstborn as Simone q. Gasparis de Chayrate de Mediolano) before 1489 (Note: Since the first document attesting the existence of the artist is the payment for a work in 1489, the date of birth may be traced back at least two decades before.) – Brescia, died before 1517), (Note: Declared dead in this year by his widow Bianca (see Zani 2010, p. 102, note 85)) was an Italian Renaissance sculptor.

The artist emerged in 1489 as part of the cultural world of Milan, beginning a successful career that turned him into a leading exponent of Renaissance sculpture in Brescia, distinguishing himself with works of cultural import such as his cycle of the Caesars for the Loggia palace in Brescia, as well as the Mausoleum of Martinengo. He introduced a powerful and highly expressive classical taste, as opposed to the hitherto existing refined decorativeness. During the first decade of the sixteenth century, Gasparo was able to win over public and private clients who sought to translate into stone their pride in their supposed historical descent from ancient Rome.

After his death, Gasparo's reputation fell into oblivion caused by unfavourable secular criticism. His complex artistic personality and catalog of works were only reconstructed from the end of the twentieth century, thanks to targeted critical studies that have for the first time allowed a thorough analysis and rediscovery of his works.

== Biography ==
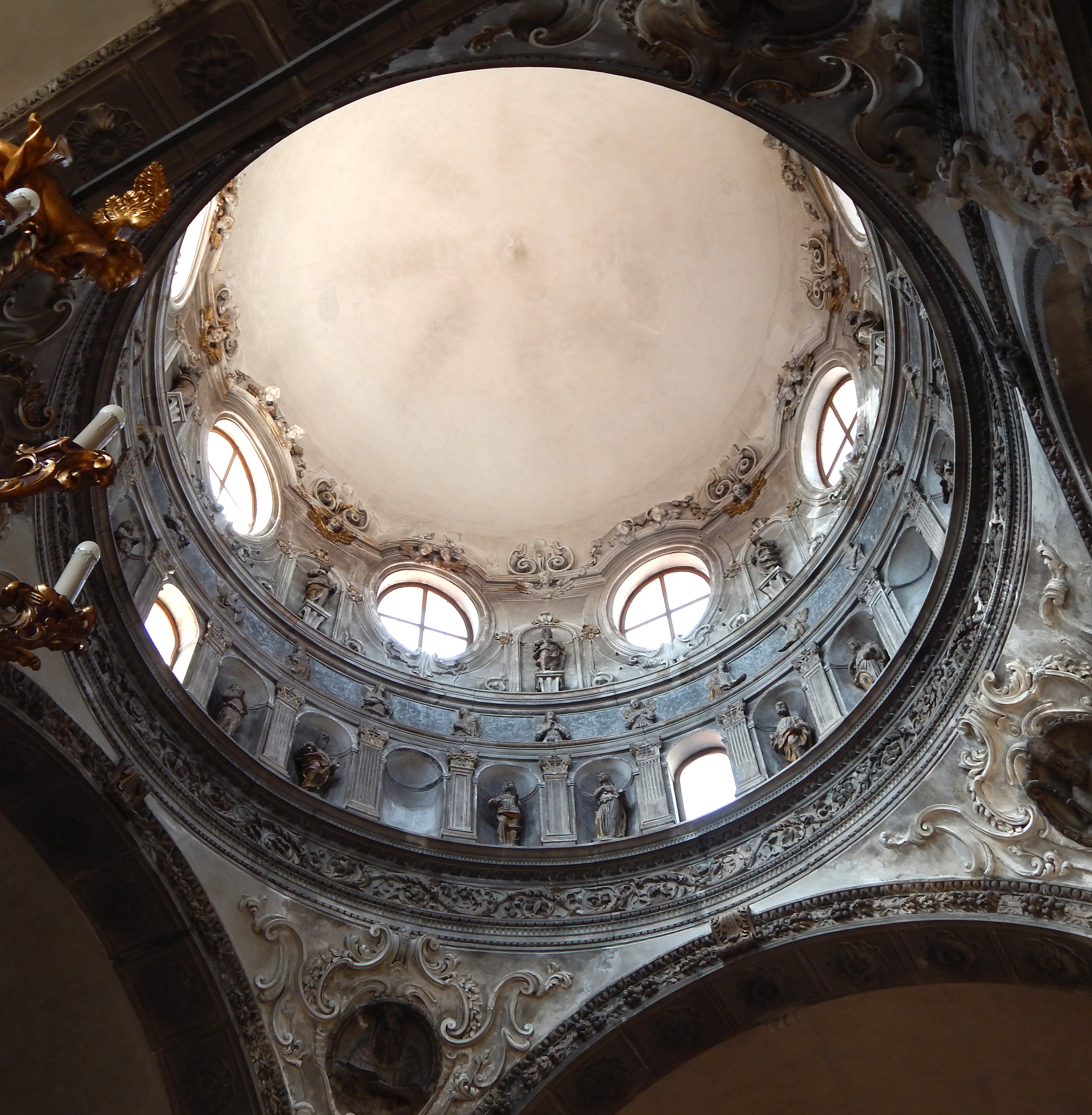
The cupola of the church of Santa Maria dei Miracoli with its cycle of the Apostles by Gasparo Cairano and some of the Angels of Antonio della Porta (1489)

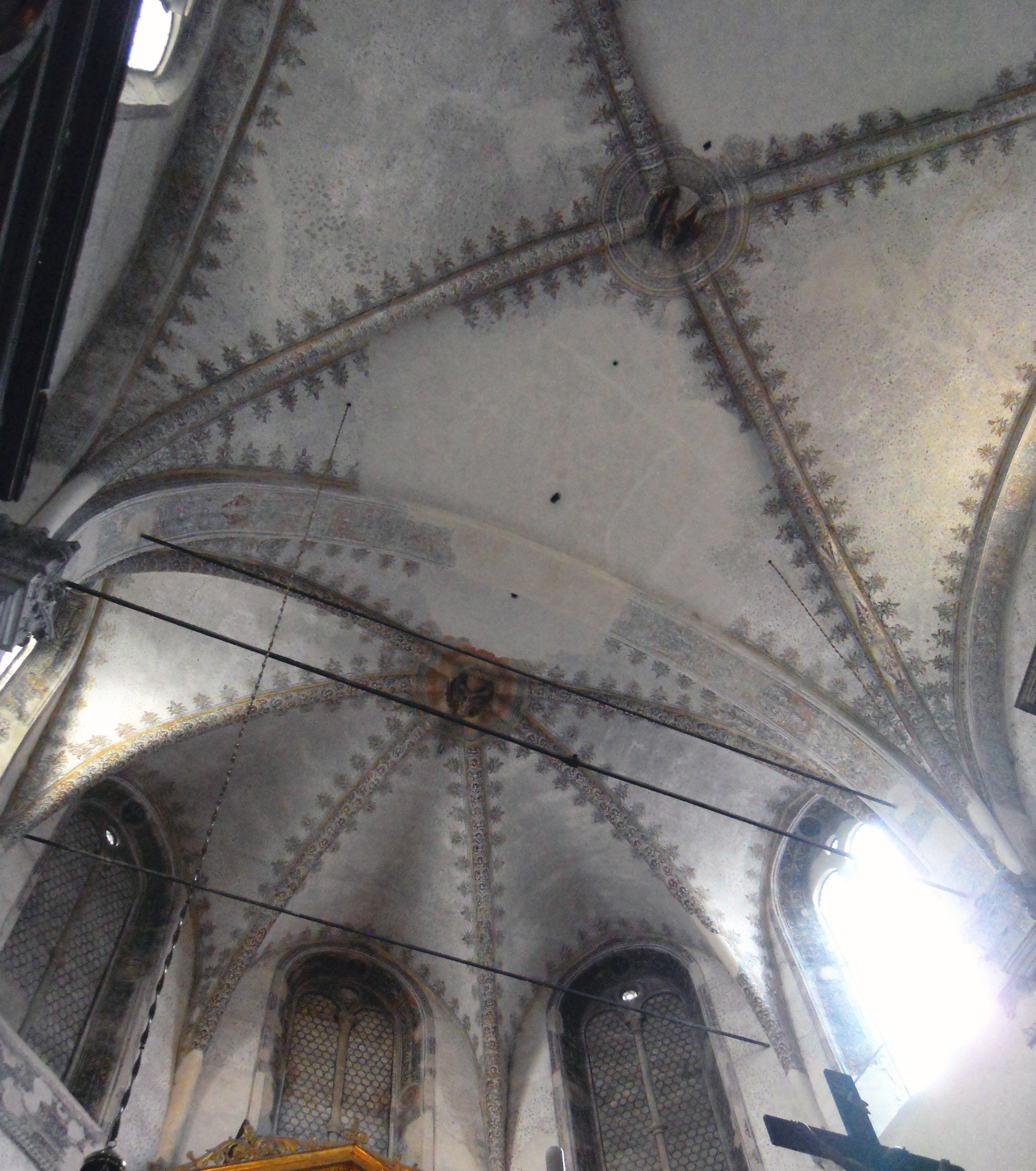
The vault of the presbytery of the Duomo Vecchio of Brescia, with the two keystones of Gasparo Cairano (1491)

Nothing is known of Gasparo Cairano before 1489. No information has been found about the date and place of his birth, education, or the circumstances that led him to Brescia. The appellation da Milano, with which he is often recalled in the sources, however, does not provide a definitive fact of his origin because it could refer to the city as well as to the dukedom or diocese. The generic reference, in any case, is compatible with the cultural basis of his artistic work. Some conjectures can be made on the surname Cairano, in particular that it leads one to Cairate in Varese province, which is to this day shortened to Caira in the local dialect. (Note: Historical sources provide other variations of the last name of Gasparo. See Zani 2010, p. 102, n. 85 and notes in the preamble to this article.)

== Career ==
=== The Santa Maria dei Miracoli ===
Cairano first documented work is from 24 December 1489 with his commission for the cycle of twelve statues of the Apostles to be installed in the first dome of the church of Santa Maria dei Miracoli, Brescia. The installation of Cairano's cycle is contemporaneous with Tamagnino's installation of the twelve angels in the lower section of the dome.

In general, all the stone sculptures at the Santa Maria dei Miracoli laid down in the decade following the cycle of the Apostles were limited to the interior of the building, and were by Cairano and his associates. There is a possibility that this limitation was the result of a confrontation between Cairano and Tamagnino. At the time Cairano worked on his Apostles, Tamagnino was the better regarded sculptor, and his superiority is evident in the artistic and technical quality of his Angels, if only for their relative modernity, following the neo-classical mode of Antonio Rizzo. It is likely, therefore, that there was some local support that allowed Cairano to penetrate Tamagnino's stronghold in Brescia, despite the former's relative underdevelopment as an artist. On the other hand, Tamagnino only created five other works within the church, and he was paid for the entire body of his work less than Cairano for his Apostles. Following this debacle, Tamagnino left the site of the church and Brescia, and only returned a decade later. (Note: See the paragraph below on Relations with Tamagnino)

=== The keystones of the old Duomo ===
Cairano's art and career began a rapid ascent following several other commissions for work within the sanctum of the Santa Maria dei Miracoli. On 16 November 1941, he was paid for two keystones for the vault of the old Duomo which was being built under the aegis of Bernardino da Martinengo. Cairano was given the sole commission for figurative sculptures in the new building. Two years later, in 1493, Cairano began work at the courtyard of the Loggia palazzo.

Evidently there was a burst in overlapping commitments and commission, both public and ecclesiastical, many of which were more important than his debut work at the Santa Maria dei Miracoli. Indeed, work in that church stopped around the same time. The sculptor returned to it only for occasional work over the following years to the end of the century; (Note: Ceriana, pp. 146, 148–149. It is also reminiscent of the San Gregorio medallion in the spandrels of the dome, part of the cycle of Doctors of the Church left unfinished by Tamagnino and also dated to about 1495–1500. For the dating of this work see Zani 2010, p. 121.) overall, however, work ceased until the mid-sixteenth century.

=== Sculptures of the Palazzo della Loggia ===
On 30 August 1493, Cairano was tasked with the decoration of the exterior of the Palazzo della Loggia with the delivery of capita 5 imperatorum romanum, or five busts for the beginning of a cycle of thirty Caesars, which would become among the finest achievements of his career. The production of these busts can be traced, in general, to a contemporary reworking of ancient portraiture. In the oldest busts, i.e., those facing the piazza, there are similarities with the image of Bartolomeo Colleoni in the memorial by Andrea del Verrocchio in Venice, with an evoking of an effigy of Antoninus Pius and a portrait of Nero, all famous images at the time and here revived in three dimensions.

A considerable leap in quality is evident here, compared to the Apostles of the church of Santa Maria dei Miracoli that had been carved just a few years earlier. The cycle of the Caesars is not only considerably grander in size but also a notable qualitative improvement over the previous production. The presence of these Caesars on the façade of the Loggia in Brescia is testament of an architectural and figurative leap, a full expression of classical art that has climbed from the earlier experiments at the Miracoli. Cairano, through the creation of the cycle and subsequent architectural ornamentation of the Loggia palazzo, becomes the fulcrum of commissions, both public and private, from Brescians keen to show off their descent from ancient Rome and to ride the wave of the local Renaissance.

Around 1497, while continuing with his work on the Caesars, Cairano also developed five keystones for the portico of the Loggia palazzo, representing Sant'Apollonio, San Faustino, San Giovita, Justice and Faith. Between 1499 and 1500, he delivered two large trophies to be placed on the top order of palazzo, while between 1493 and 1505, Cairano participated in the fulfilment of leonine protome, capitals, and candelabras and friezes for the same top order. The attention of the artist to his craft and productions is evident, and it influenced in general all the decorative sculptural works made for the palazzo at the time.

Cairano's concentration on the Caesars is interrupted only briefly by the return of Tamagnino between 1499 and 1500. Tamagnino, likely based on his lauded works at the Certosa di Pavia, receives a commission for six different Caesars and other sculptures. But in an art scene increasingly monopolised by Cairano, who has come a long way from his naive expression of the Apostles, Tamagnino does not garner much attention, and, humiliated by the cold reception, he leaves Brescia, probably never to return.

=== The private commissions of Brunelli and Caprioli ===
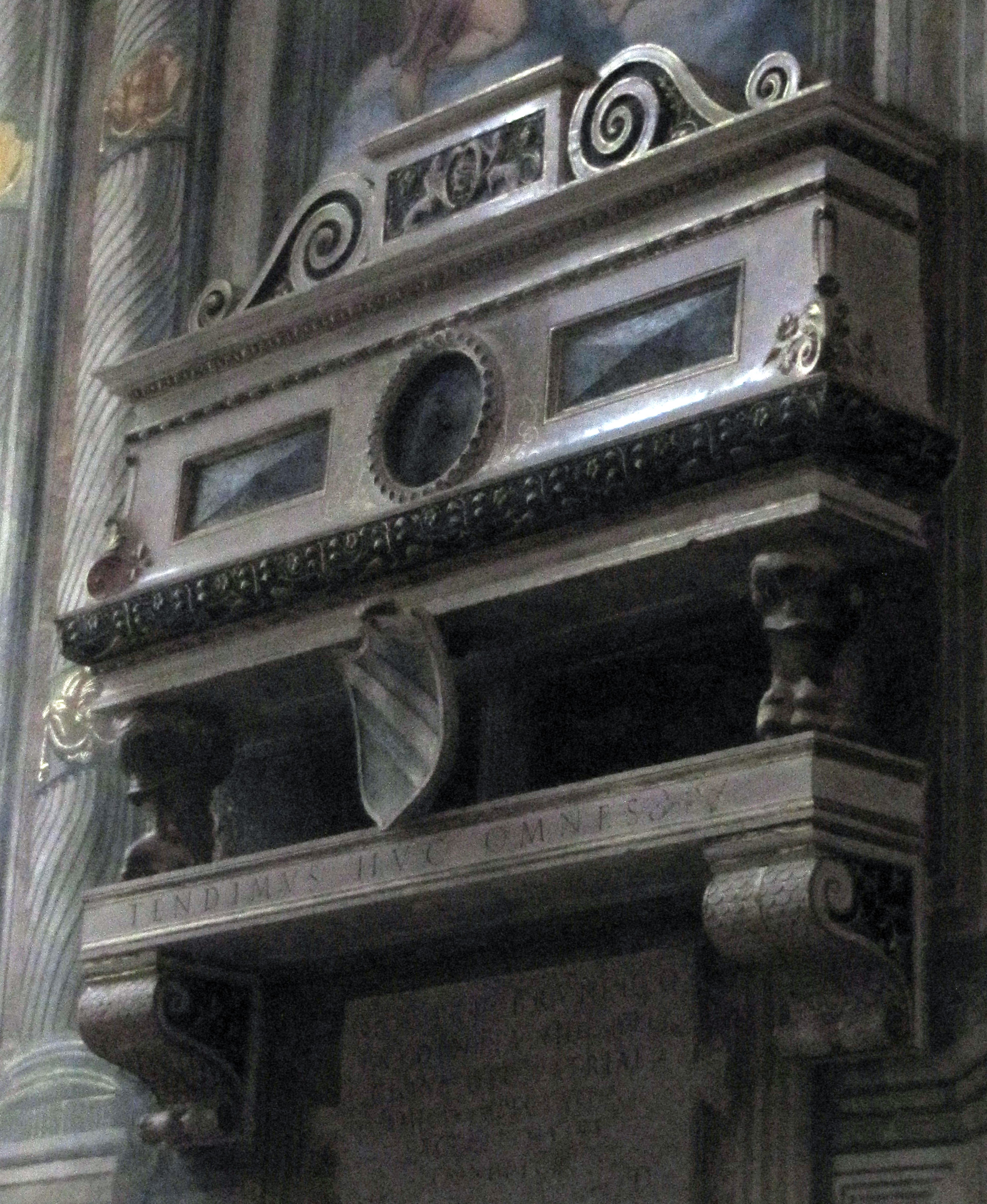
Funerary monument of Gaspare Brunelli, 1496–1500

Having gained prestige from the constructions in the Loggia, Cairano received at least two commissions from the nobility of Brescia. Involved in the leadership of the new administration, they were certainly aware of his ability. There are papers dating back to 1496 that document Cairano's commission for the Tomb of Gaspare Brunelli, which, in 1500, was placed in the Brunelli chapel within the Church of St Francis. During the same period, the Caprioli family commissioned the tomb of Luigi Caprioli to be placed within their chapel in the church of San Giorgio, probably together with other sculptures, made probably in collaboration with the Sanmicheli workshop, to which is attributed the marble jamb decorated with candelabras.

Caprioli's memorial was broken up in the nineteenth century, (Note: Possibly in 1805, even before the church was condemned. See Zani 2010, p. 117.) so only the Caprioli Adoration remains. A masterpiece of Cairano's, this was placed in 1841 by Rodolfo Vantini on the high altar of the St Francis of Assisi church. Cairano demonstrates a high technical mastery, not only in the extremely precise orientation of the boxes, but also in the choice of the monolithic block, which, in fact, is not strictly necessary for this kind of work. From Bernardino Faino and Francesco Paglia and other seventeenth and eighteenth century scholars, we know that the relief was placed by some architectural system. It was supposed to be a figurative piece, created perhaps by the same artist, but which has not been traced.

=== The sculptures of San Pietro in Oliveto and San Francesco ===
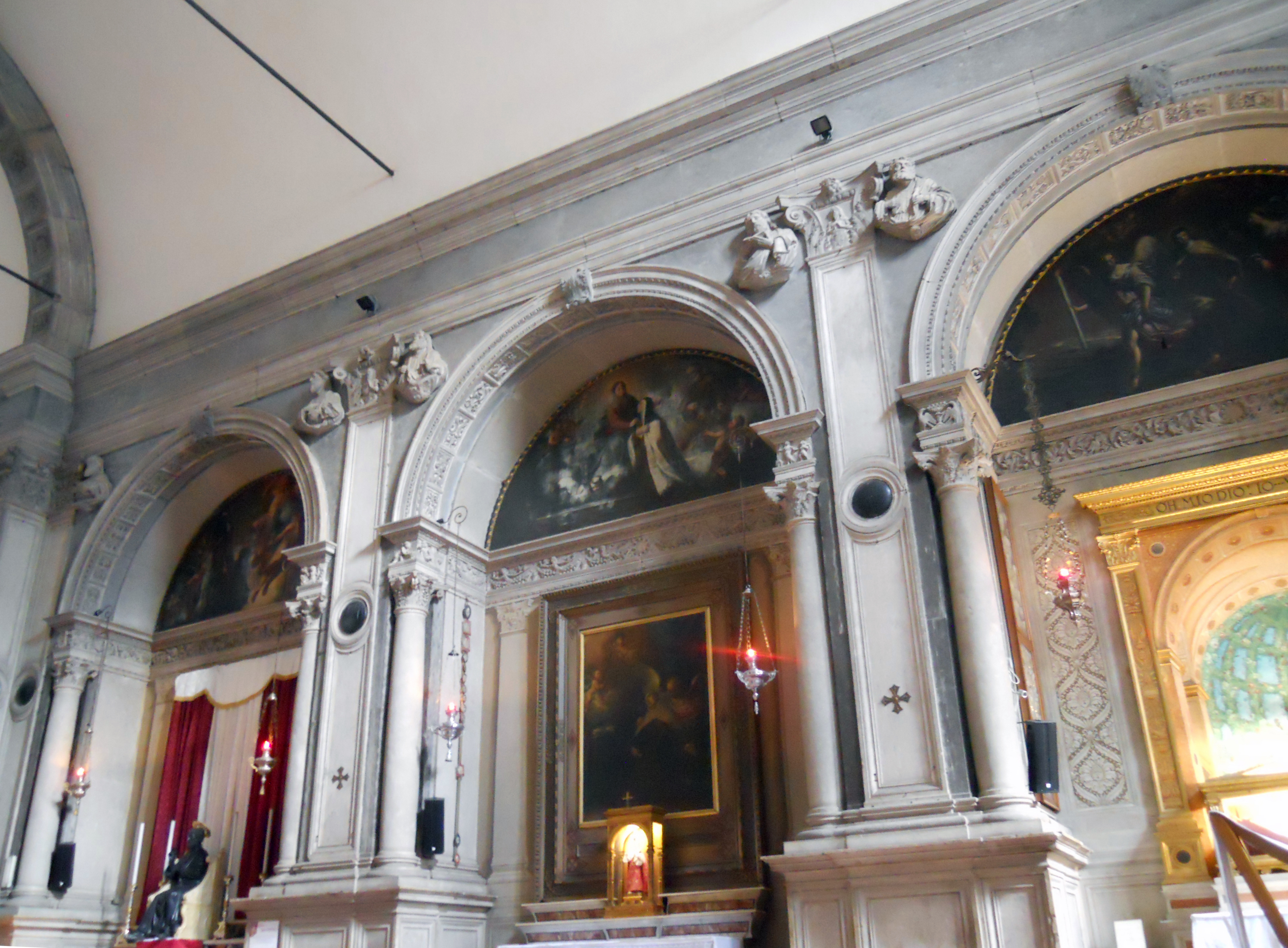
Interior of the church of San Pietro in Oliveto (circa 1507)

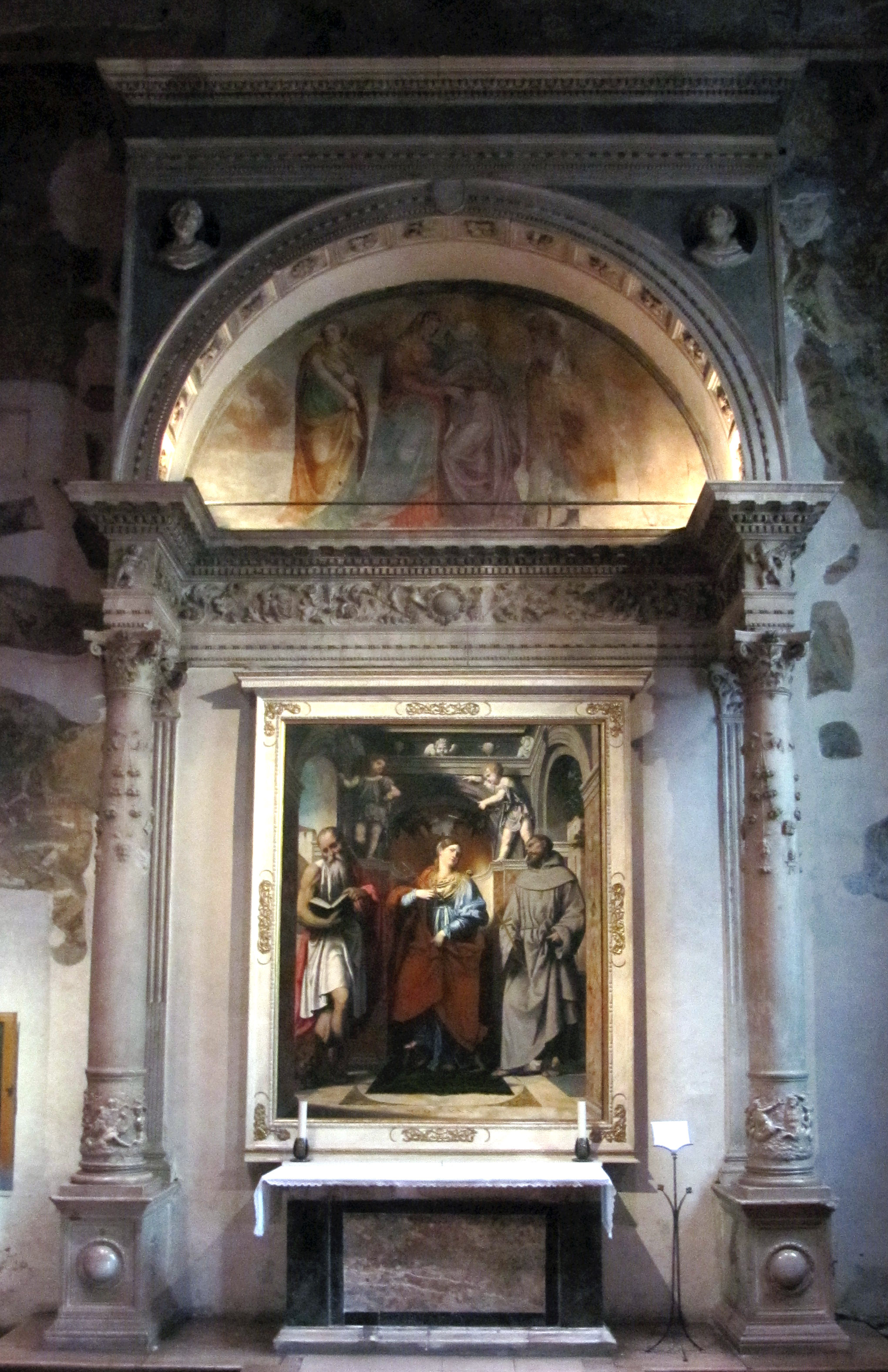
The altar of San Girolamo (circa 1506–1510)

In 1503, Cairano made the last deliveries in the Caesar cycle for the front of the Loggia palace, and finished up the bulk of his work on the site; no further records of his presence exist. (Note: The production of generic decorative scores continued for a few more years, until the interruption of the work for reasons of war, but not necessarily under the guidance of Gasparo, though could still visit the site often to follow this final phase. See Zani 2010, p. 107.) For the artist, this was the end of his big public commissions, which he probably gained before establishing his career and subsequent success. He now had to reorganise his business and set up closer ties with the contacts he made during his work at the Loggia, including co-workers and other artists in and around Brescia, looking for major commissions. However, his path appeared to lead him increasingly toward sacred art. In 1504, the canon of the Basilica of San Pietro de Dom, Francisco Franzi of Orzinuovi bequeathed the construction of a chapel in the cathedral. Nothing further is known of this commission.

By 1507, however, Cairano's decorative lapidary work in the interior of the San Pietro in Oliveto became known as the third great achievement of the artist, after the Miracoli and the Loggia. The architectural scores that punctuate the sequence of the altar and the composition of the whole, however, are unrelated to Cairano's style. Rather, they are consistent with Sanmicheli, who indeed possessed the only workshop in town capable of engaging a work of this magnitude. Certainly the twelve Apostles in the spandrels in the arches of the nave are Cairano's work – the artist's hand is unmistakable. There is very poor and fragmentary documentation relating to this historic building that has come down to us.

To Cairano, also, is attributed the Altar of San Girolamo in the church of St Francis. One of the critical issues of Renaissance sculpture in Brescia is the lack of historical sources on its origin. Certainly the altar was carved after 1506, (Note: On the base of the left column there is an effigy of Pope Julius II inferred from the obverse of a medal of Caradosso and Gian Cristoforo Romano cast after 1506. See Zani 2010, p. 125.) given its high quality and artistic originality, indeed the highest level of art in the Brescian period, and evokes several features of Cairano's earlier work on the Loggia and front-yard of San Pietro's church in Oliveto.

=== The entrance of the Salò duomo ===
The Entrance to the Duomo of Salò (1506–1508)

The construction of the entrance to the Duomo of Salò is copiously documented between 1506 and 1509. The design was by Cairano, most likely in collaboration with Antonio Mangiacavalli. Cairano's hand is evident in the figures of the Father, St. Peter and St. John the Baptist, leaving the Virgin to his collaborator, while the Angel of the Annunciation and two small busts in the spandrels appear to be a joint work. The architectural parts were accomplished by different stonemasons as recorded in the documents relating to the workshops, including Mangiacavalli's son. The portal was put in place by August 1508, and embellishments and other work ended at the beginning of 1509.

The work at Salò and associated documentation, reconstructed through the numerous bills and payments, attests to the complex relationship between Cairano and Mangiacavalli. They shared staff, which was directed by either of them depending on who was on site. Such collaborative work, which has already been noted at San Pietro in Oliveto are emblematic of Cairano's artistic activity, which became increasingly busy and varied as public and private commissions poured in the first decade of the sixteenth century following the work at the Loggia palazzo. However, Cairano's attention was not directed to Salò, which he visited rarely, or even to San Pietro in Oliveto, which was mainly run by Sanmicheli, but to two works of greater importance and resonance: the grand staircase of the Loggia and the arch at Sant'Apollonio.

=== The return to the Loggia: the grand staircase ===
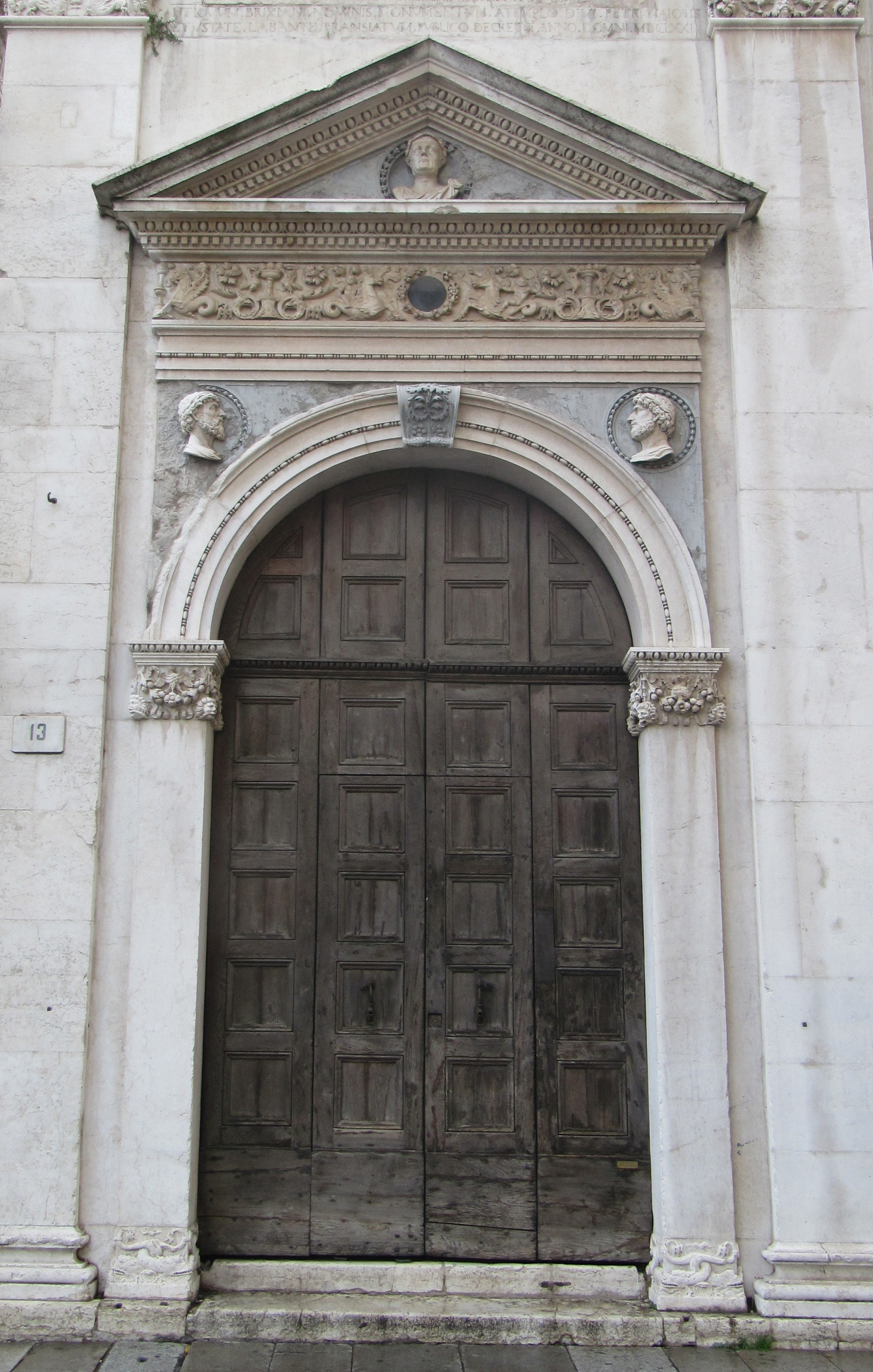
Entrance to the grand stairs of the Palazzo della Loggia (1503–1508)

By 1508, construction work was completed at the north of the Loggia, which contained the staircase to access the upper level of the public building. The construction is designed as a body in itself, separated from the main building by a path and connected to it by a covered overpass, a configuration that has come down to us intact. The contribution of Cairano, who at that point returned to the Loggia after at least five years of a stellar career elsewhere, is the portal to the ground floor of the annex and in some ornamentation on the overpass.

The entrance is resolved in a manner simultaneously elegant and eccentric, in an almost exuberant and free syntax. The canonical orders are absent, and the collection is conceived as an imaginative blend of quasi-archaeological redeployment. For this reason, critics do not attribute the project to Cairano, which remains a formidable invention that is highly representative of antiquarian culture of the time. Surely Cairano's, however, is the hand that produced the sculptures along with anthropomorphic figures, dolphins and fantastic creatures, the artist already experimented with these in the Loggia; and once again, the artist inserted small Caesars, both on the portal as well as the overpass, which achieve the poetic zenith of some of his portraiture of old.

=== The ark of Sant'Apollonio ===
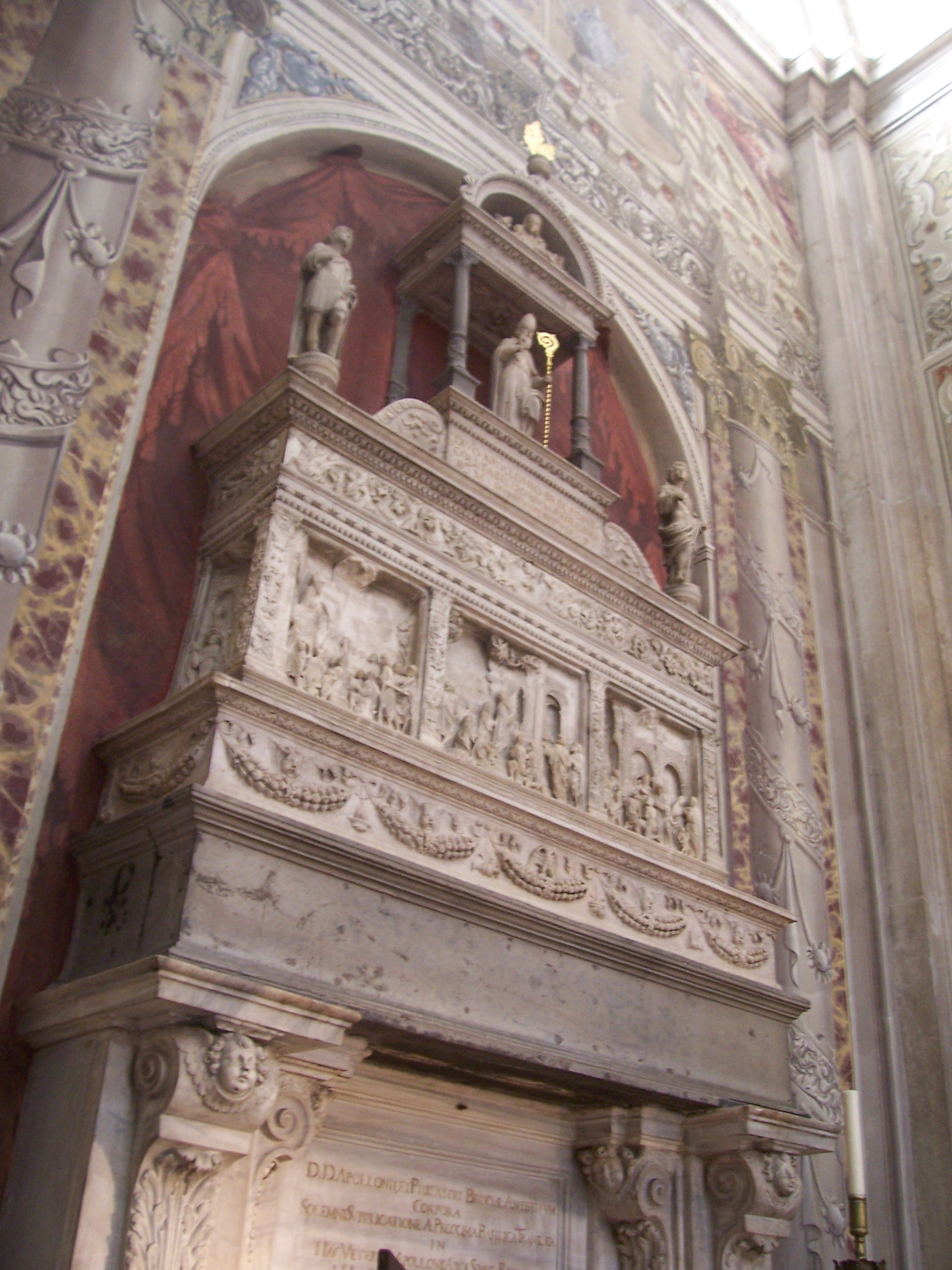
The Ark of Sant'Appollonio (1508–1510)

On 5 January 1503, the relics of Sant'Appollonio were discovered in the Basilica of San Pietro de Dom. In June, a resolution of the General council asked the chamber of notaries to finance a new reliquary ark, which however was not immediately funded.

In 1506, the Council issued a peremptory reminder to the chamber for the funds, and the works probably began in September 1508. The relics were to be ceremoniously transferred to the reliquary in July 1510, by which time the ark was to have been finished. Hence, it is possible to date the implementation of the project to 1508–1510.

In 1505, the ark of San Tiziano, designed by Sanmicheli, had been put in place in the Church of the Saints Cosma and Damiano in Brescia. This had had a resonance in the artistic world at the time, and led to the revival of a workshop that was no longer quite in vogue. Cairano committed deeply into the ark of Sant'Appollonio, which counts among his major works and effectively supplants Sanmicheli's ark for monumentality and refined ornamentation. In the new work, Cairano provides further proof of his abilities, excelling forcefully in a scenario where he is peerless, and responding to Sanmicheli with a production of the highest quality.

Vito Zani pointed out in 2012 that the face of San Faustino is unfinished; it has been brought to a level of definition close to the sanding surface. These parts were not ground flat, but worked with a chisel directly, thereby ignoring the canonical technical process, and providing further evidence of the virtuosity of Gasparo Cairano in sculpting heads. (Note: That is, the mode of execution of this statue, which is visible due to lack of polishing, shows that Gasparo Cairano sculpted his works directly with a flat chisel, probably without ever resorting to the toothed chisel. See Zani, Vito (November 2012). "Un marmo lombardo del Rinascimento e qualche precisazione sulla scultura lapidea a Brescia tra Quattro e Cinquecento". Antiqua.)

=== The sack of Brescia and after ===
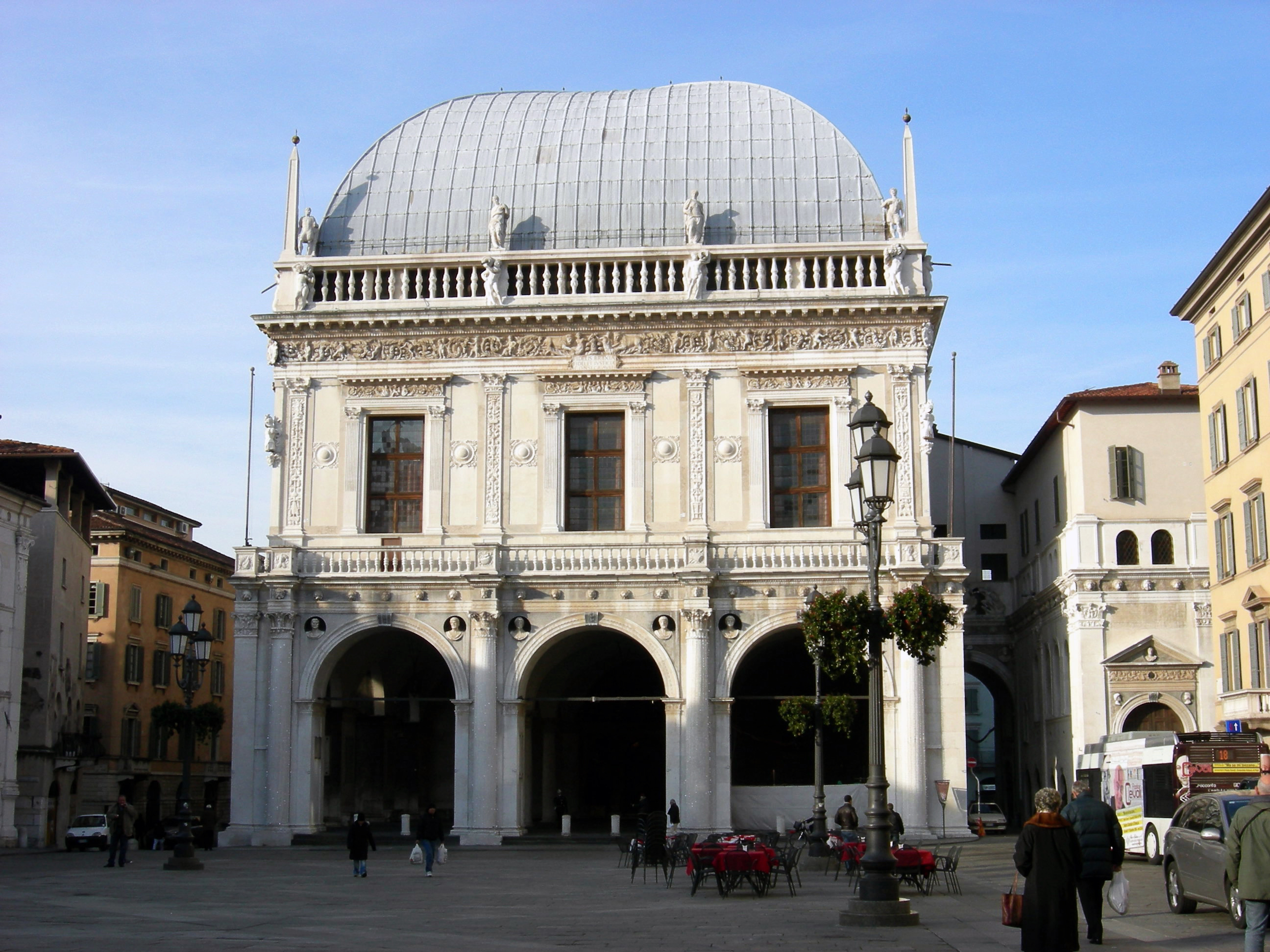
The Loggia palazzo in Brescia

At the end of the first decade of the century, the political climate in Europe was feverish: the War of the League of Cambrai had begun. The French, under Gaston of Foix, Duke of Nemours, had sacked Brescia in 1512, the town now in ruins and the myth of Brixia magnipotens shattered. (Note: See Zani 2010, pp. 24–25. with related notes to the text, bibliography and documentation cited.) A lively era of humanism and trade was ended, a phenomenon that would affect the rest of the peninsula in the following decades.

The great Renaissance projects of Brescia were interrupted by the war. Even the Loggia palazzo, where Cairano had already established scaffolds to mount the figures on the second level, including two angular trophies, was not to see a resumption of work till fifty years later, under the direction of Ludovico Beretta. The town's priorities had changed from artistic pomp and cultural recovery to basic necessities and vital functions.

Cairano was undoubtedly affected by this period of sudden and profound decay, if only because of the sharp decline in commissions. After a decade of intense activity with several overlapping projects, a new stage in his career began, one which is obscured from the documentary view. The last relevant document in this regard is the contract for the entrance to the Duomo of Chiari in 1513, while the next document, in 1517, states that Cairano was already dead. Apart from this, there are other works from the period attributed to him, including the complex question of the completion of the Martinengo mausoleum.

=== The entrance of the Chiari duomo and work in Parma ===
In 1513, Gasparem de Cayrano de Mediolano lapicida architectum et ingeniarum optimum signed the contract for the construction of a new entrance to the Duomo of Chiari. The document, a reconfirmation of an earlier negotiation, shows that the artist and the municipality had agreed terms two years earlier, but the plans hadn't been executed because of the war in the Brescia area. The contract provided for the fulfilment of the entire project – from the architectural parts to the figurative sculptures, including a group with the Madonna between the Saints Faustino and Giovita. These are now missing, so it's impossible to assess the evolution of Cairano's art after the completion of the ark of Sant'Appollonio. The rest of the work, moreover, again raise questions about the architectural skills of the artist that are still unanswered.

Also attributable to Gasparo Cairano, and dated at this stage, is the singular St John the Baptist placed in the tympanum of the capitol of the eponymous Abbey in Parma. The work, undocumented and traditionally attributed by critics to Antonio Ferrari d'Agrate, was assigned in 2010 to the catalog of the works of Cairano due to obvious correlation with the mature art of the artist. This spread of Gasparo's artistic reach is significant and demonstrates that he could prove a success even outside of Brescia.

=== The Martinengo mausoleum ===
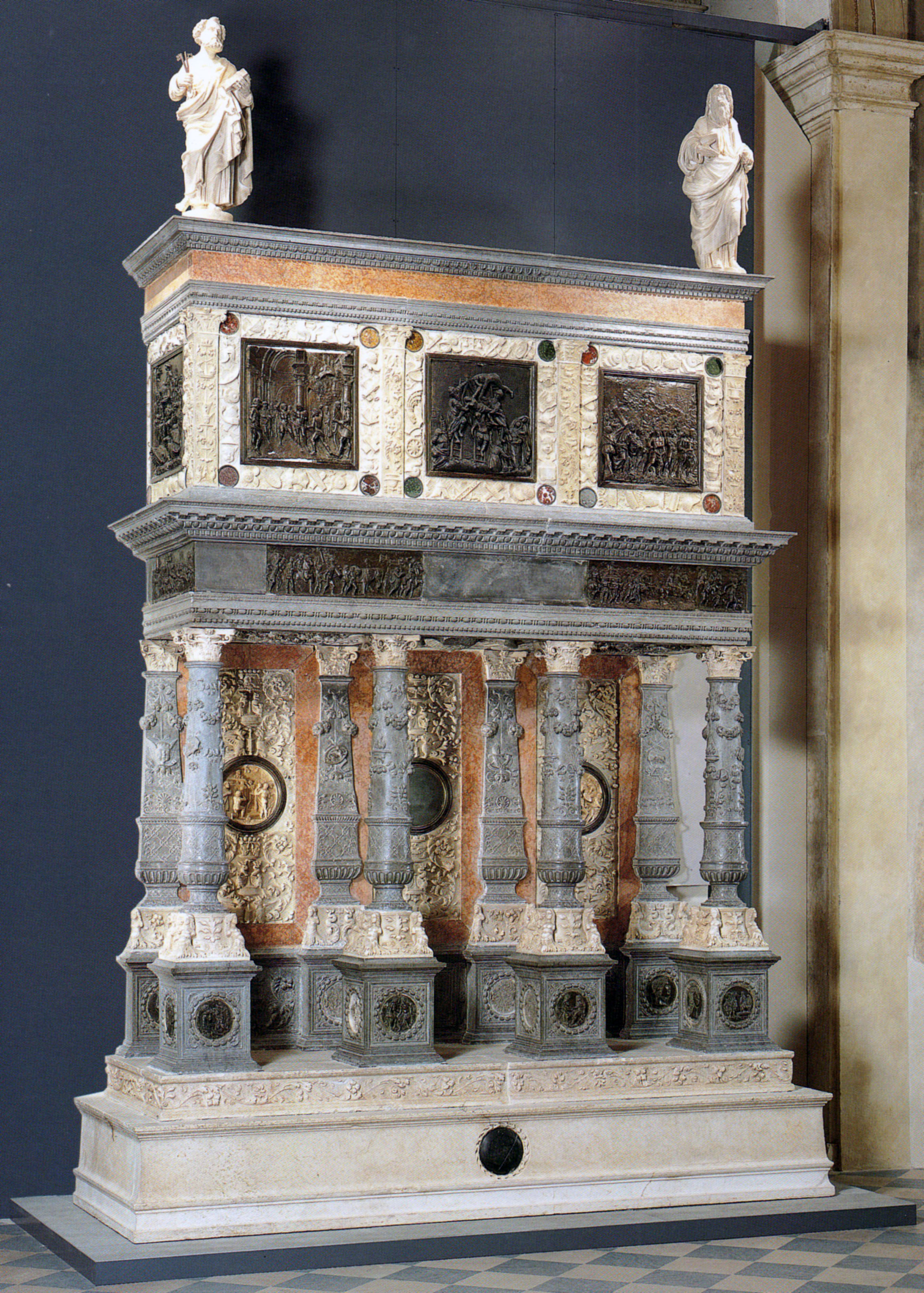
The Martinengo mausoleum (1503–1518)

One of the questions on the later years of Cairano's career is that of the completion of the Martinengo mausoleum, the largest funereal monument of the Brescian renaissance. (Note: There are several hypotheses for possible reconstructions of the story, which is very complex from a historico-critical point of view. See Zani 2010, pp. 109, 135–138, and the literature on this monument indicated in Zani 2010, p. 138.) The commission to the jeweller and sculptor Bernardino delle Croci by the brothers Francesco and Antonio Il Martinengo of Padernello dated to 1503, with a term of three years for completion. The tomb was to house the remains of Bernardino Martinengo, the father of the two, who had left a bequest towards the work on his death in 1501 or 1502. However, it was still unfinished in 1516, when delle Croci was commissioned per a new contract to finish it by January 1518. The causes for the delay appear to have been, firstly, a commercial dispute between the jeweller and the clients, and secondly the war of 1512, which surely slowed the work, even if not entirely stopping it. It was not until 1516, following the reconquest of Brescia by the Venetian republic, that a new definitive agreement was made. The documents are incomplete but in fact the monument was completed and installed within the Corpus Christi church, probably within the terms of the contract.

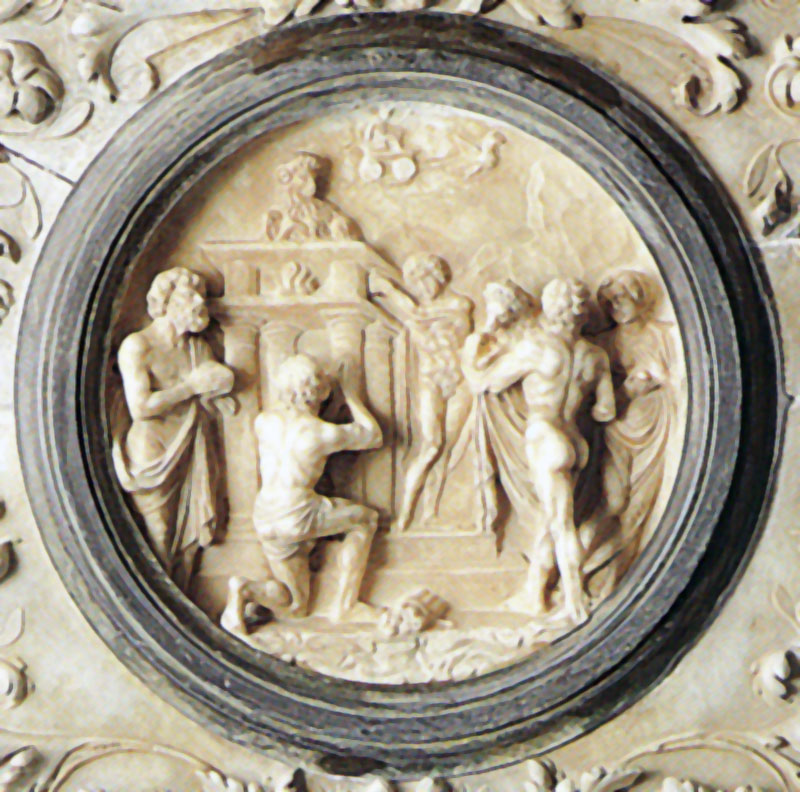
Martinengo mausoleum, Scene of sacrifice (post-1510)

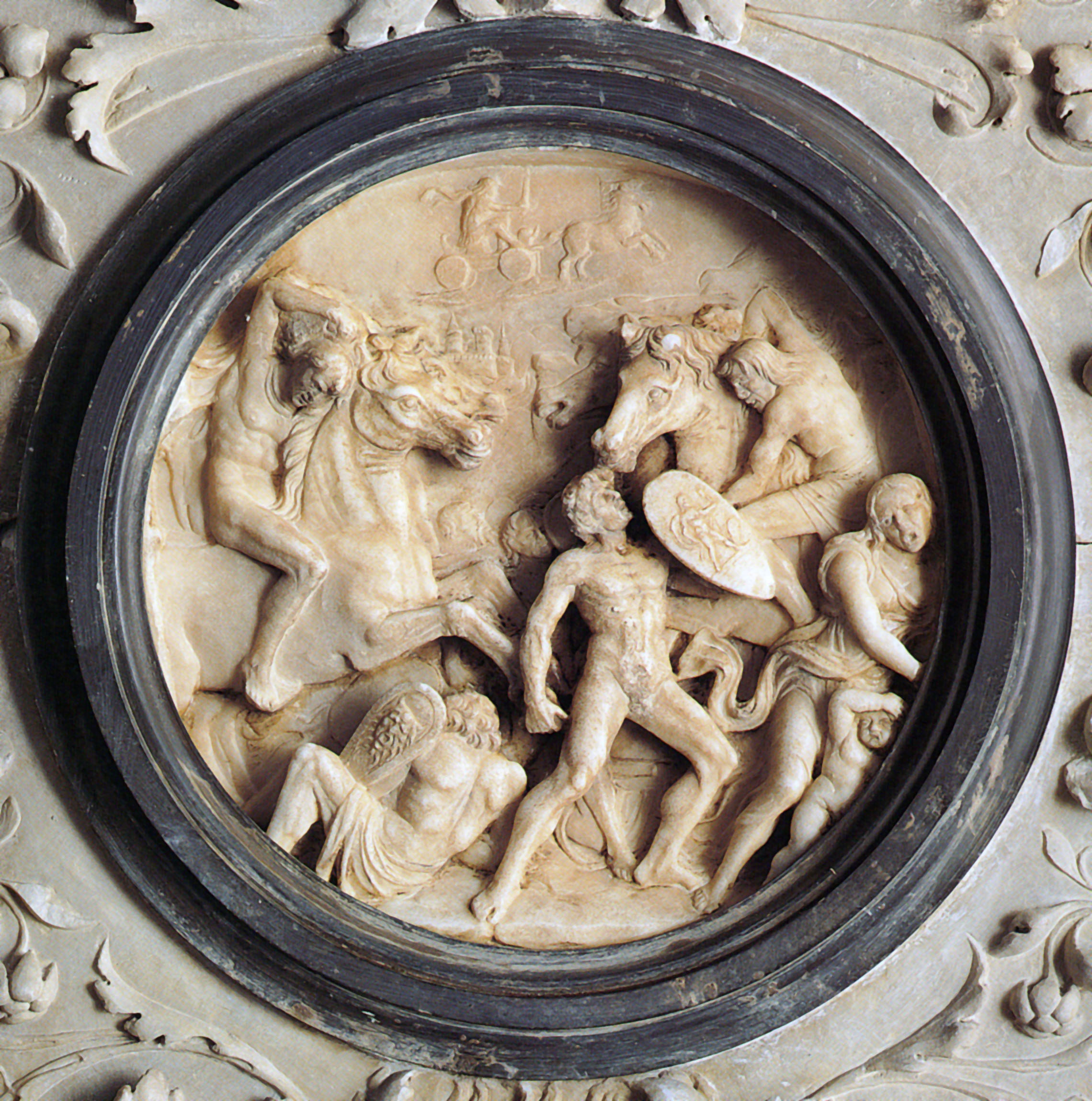
Martinengo mausoleum, Battle scene (post-1510)

The documentation of the various phrases of the construction makes no mention of anyone other than Bernardino delle Croci, but it is not clear if he really had the skills the create a sculptural structure of this type. A reappraisal of Brescian art of the period, as well as the clear evidence of the style, have led critics to assign to Cairano the execution of the stone parts of the monument, limiting delle Croci's involvement only to the bronze inserts. The jeweller, consequently, assumed the entire Martinengo commission but entrusted the parts outside his competence, most of the monument in fact, to the Cairano studio.

Note that the final contract with delle Croci was in 1516 (Note: This is a complex historico-critical discourse as evidenced by extant documentation; indeed, their interpretation is still debated. Besides Zani 2010, pp. 109, 135–138, see the considerations presented in Zani, Vito (September 2012). "Un marmo lombardo del Rinascimento e qualche precisazione sulla scultura lapidea a Brescia tra Quattro e Cinquecento (seconda parte)". Antiqua. and Zani, Vito (November 2012). "Un marmo lombardo del Rinascimento e qualche precisazione sulla scultura lapidea a Brescia tra Quattro e Cinquecento (terza e ultima parte)". and the notes to the text and bibliography therein.) whereas Cairano was definitively dead in 1517: if Cairano indeed worked on the monument, it can be deduced from the documents that he would not have had sufficient time to finish it completely within the period, and consequently a large part of it must have been done before this date. (Note: Likely, Gasparo was unable to see the work completed; its execution could have been taken over by the studio and, in particular, by his son Simone. See Zani 2010, p. 138.) This means admitting Cairano's involvement prior to 1516, which is not attested in the documents. (Note: An initial participation of the Sanmicheli, Bartolomeo and his son Matteo, cannot be ruled out, at least for the first design and execution of the monument, because its dominant decorative elements are alien to Cairano's style. See Zani 2010, p. 137.) Indeed, the same contract of 1516 asserts that the work was incomplete when installed in the church; it is unknown what its condition was at the time; and the remains of Bernardino Martinengo were already housed in it from the previous year. The implication is that the progress on the monument may have been near completion, at least in the structure and architectural components. The incompleteness alluded to in the documents of 1516 likely refer to the decorative inserts of various types, including the bronzes definitively due to della Croci.

A thorough stylistic analysis of the ornamentation of the monument, in particular of the figures within the circles of the Battle scene and the Scene of sacrifice reveal a surprising sensitivity to bronze on the part of Cairano, and considerable scope for reinterpretation and commingling of styles. This stemmed from a sensible response to the context in which the mausoleum was designed and implemented. Unprecedented in Brescia was the combination of bronze and stone, the former under the supervision of Bernardino delle Croci who certainly had a vast catalogue of references to ancient and contemporary works, all of which are cited in the major and minor rounds on the base. It is difficult to exclude Cairano from the influence of so much classicism, but the sole Scene of sacrifice attests to the sophistication of his chisel and the innovative combination of sculpture and bronzes around 1510, to which date much of the remaining lapidary apparatus can also be placed. (Note: This dialogue of stone with bronze is found in Cairano's oeuvre, namely the contemporary altar of San Girolamo in the Church of St Francis of Assisi, where the extraordinary adaptation of Andrea Mantegna's Battle of the sea gods is typical of bronze work, imparting similar scenes along continuous circular bands. In this case, the main referents may be Pier Jacopo Alari Bonacolsi's Gonzaga Vase (1480–1483) in the Galleria Estense at Modena, and the bases of the three pillars in the Piazza San Marco in Venice, executed by Alessandro Leopardi in 1505. See Zani, Vito (March 2013). "Una copia del Sacrificio del Mausoleo Martinengo e alcune note iconografiche e stilistiche". Antiqua.)

=== Works after 1510 ===
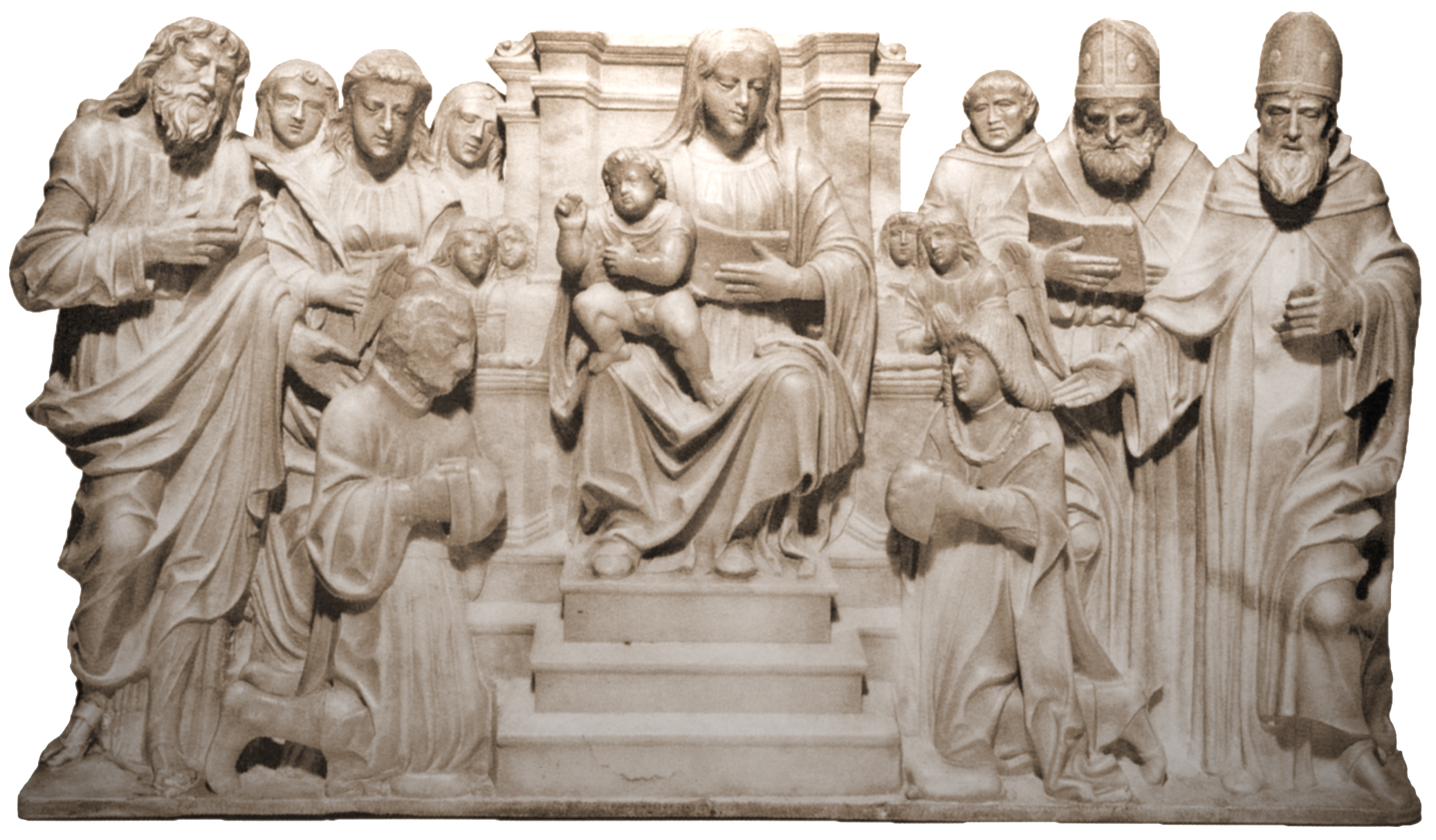
The Pala Kress (c. 1505–1510)

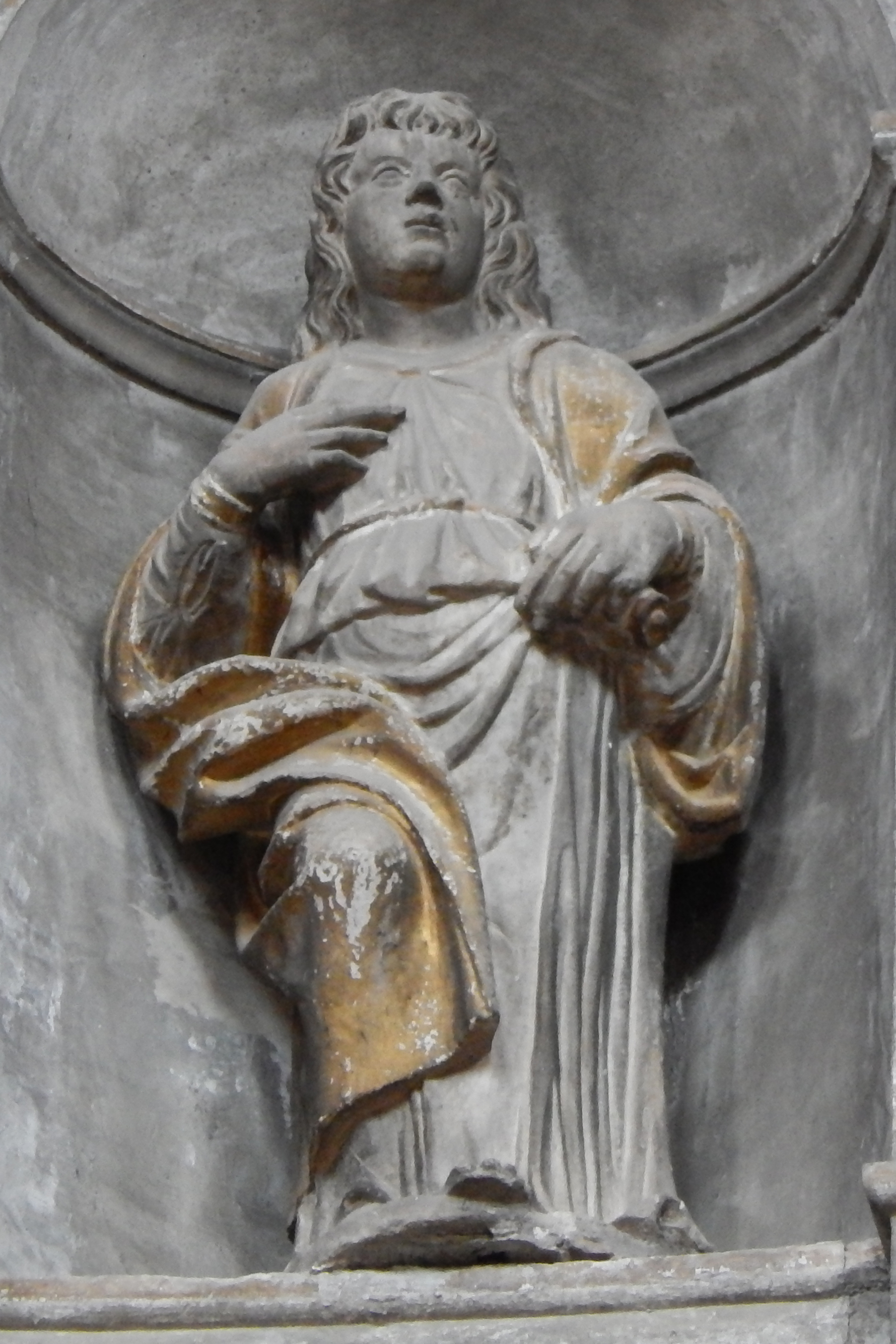
Saint between the Apostles of the Santa Maria dei Miracoli (c. 1510–1515)

Stylistic considerations place a number of works, usually small statues, reliefs or fragments removed from their original context and scattered in different locations to the middle of the second decade of the sixteenth century. It is not yet clear whether these artefacts were due to Cairano or the immediate result of his collaborators, for example, his son Simone. These are works in which the boundary between the maturity of Cairano's art and the work of the studio is blurred, and discernment depends on an analysis of Cairano's development from his earliest works, such as the Sanctuary of Miracles and the Loggia, (Note: See, for the references to the models of Loggia, the roundel with the Scene of the battle of the Martinengo mausoleum, while for the latest evolution of the Apostles, see the statues of St Peter and St Paul in the crown of the same monument as well as the Saint inserted in cycle of the dome of Santa Maria dei Miracoli. Zani 2010, pp. 109–110, 137–138, 140–141.) combined with clear attempts at cultural update. This is the case, for example, with Cairano's Lamentation over the dead Christ preserved in The Museum of Ancient Art, Milan, and the Descent from the Cross in the Santa Giulia Museum of Brescia, which seem to point to pictorial models of Giovanni Bellini and Girolamo Romani. Another prominent work, dated to the first decade of the century, is the so-called Pala Kress in the National Gallery of Art in Washington, D.C.

After the contract in 1513 for the entrance of the cathedral of Chiari, Cairano is no longer named in any document known. The first relevant text following, in chronological order, is a policy of valuation in 1517 of Bianca, his wife, which states she is already a widow. The death of Cairano is then placed between these two dates, probably around 1515 or a little later.

=== Artistic legacy ===
There is some documentation that allows us to reconstruct a genealogy of artists after Gasparo, from his son Simone onwards. Though little information is available about Simone, it appears that no works are attributed directly to him; rather, he appears to have worked as a builder when outside his father's workshop. (Note: See Boselli, p 289. The recovered documents range between 1519 and 1548.) In a bill dated 1534, Simone declares his age as 38, born in 1496, and around twenty years of age on his father's death. He also cites his firstborn son Gasparo, twelve years old, in turn a sculptor, (Note: Camillo Boselli has published some documents on "Gasparo Cairano the Younger" that place him between 1545 and 1558: see Boselli, p. 150 (document summary). Among these are recorded his membership in a stonecutters' guild in 1557; also dated the same year, a contract for the execution of some columns for the monastery of Santa Giulia in Brescia.) his wife Catlina, sister of the engraver Andrea Testi of Manerbio. A daughter of Gasparo, Giulia, became the wife of an artisan potter, while a third child, Giovanni Antonio, was a qualified goldsmith, as indicated in a deed relating Stefano Lamberti and Bernardino delle Croci.

In light of this information, it is unlikely that Cairano, at his death, was able to pass on an artistic legacy to assure the survival of his studio, despite having trained his son and other co-workers, as well as artists such as Ambrogio Mazzola, (Note: For a biographical outline of and documents and works attributed to Mazzola, see Zani 2010, p. 110, note 145.) whose Madonna and Child, signed and dated 1536 and preserved in the Victoria and Albert Museum in London, clearly shows the influence of Cairano's style from thirty years before. This appears to be a nostalgic and naive tribute to a master, who apparently had bequeathed an artistic footprint that his collaborators not only replicated tirelessly but also felt unable to evolve further.

== Gasparo Cairano in the Brescia Renaissance ==
An understanding of the artistic personality of Gasparo Cairano has to be mediated by a proper contextualization of the contemporary art scene of Brescia. He can be referred to as a novice artist at the beginning, when the Lombard migrant, like many of his contemporaries, arrived in Brescia during the innovative construction of the Santa Maria dei Miracoli and started a successful career. That historic moment, with the municipality in search of innovating artists, was also beneficial: he proved able to interpret in stone the boastful self-celebration of the high offices, public and private, of renaissance Brescia. He quickly became the leading innovator of sculptural practice in the region, continually outperforming the already weak competition, which appeared mainly in the shape of Sanmicheli and Antonio della Porta.

=== Competitors: Cairano and Sanmicheli ===
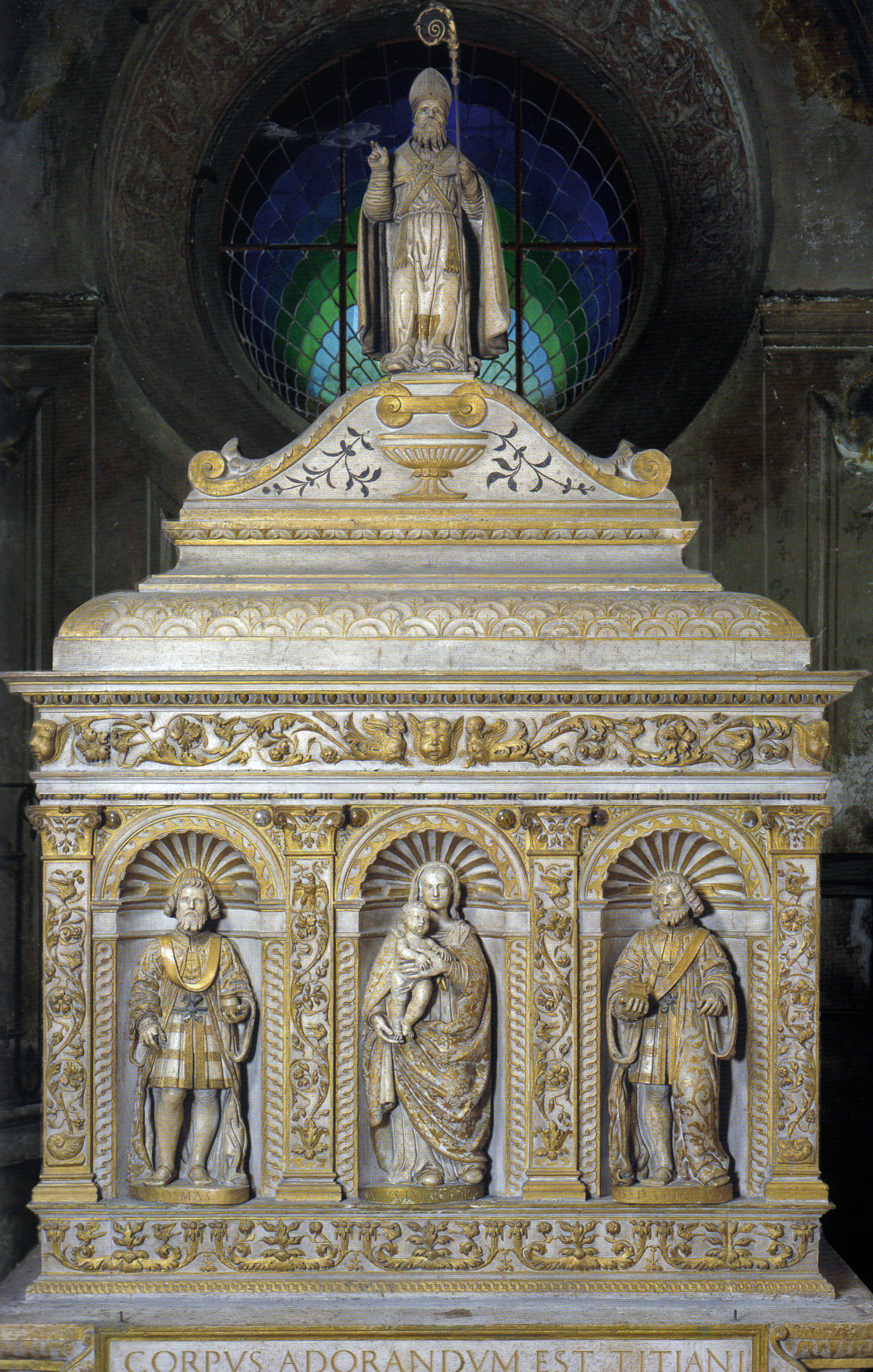
Studio of Sanmicheli, Ark of San Tiziano (1505)

The competition that quickly developed between Cairano and the experts of the Sanmicheli studio is evident in the artworks and their chronological sequence. They had been the major artistic personalities of the city at least since the beginning of the construction of Santa Maria dei Miracoli and ended up supplanted by the rise of the new master sculptor. The first documentary evidence of the company of the Sanmicheli brothers, Bartolomeo and Giovanni, originally from Porlezza on Lake Como, appears in the 1480s in Verona; by the end of the century, they had obtained important commissions in various northern Italian cities. (Note: In particular, note the chapel of the Blessed Sacrament in the Mantua Cathedral, one of the few Sanmicheli works of the fifteenth century that have survived to this day; also, a lost chapel in the Bergamo church of the Holy Spirit. For the Mantuan chapel, see Ferrari & Zanata, pp. 84,94,98; for the rest, see Zani 2010, p. 93, note 29.)

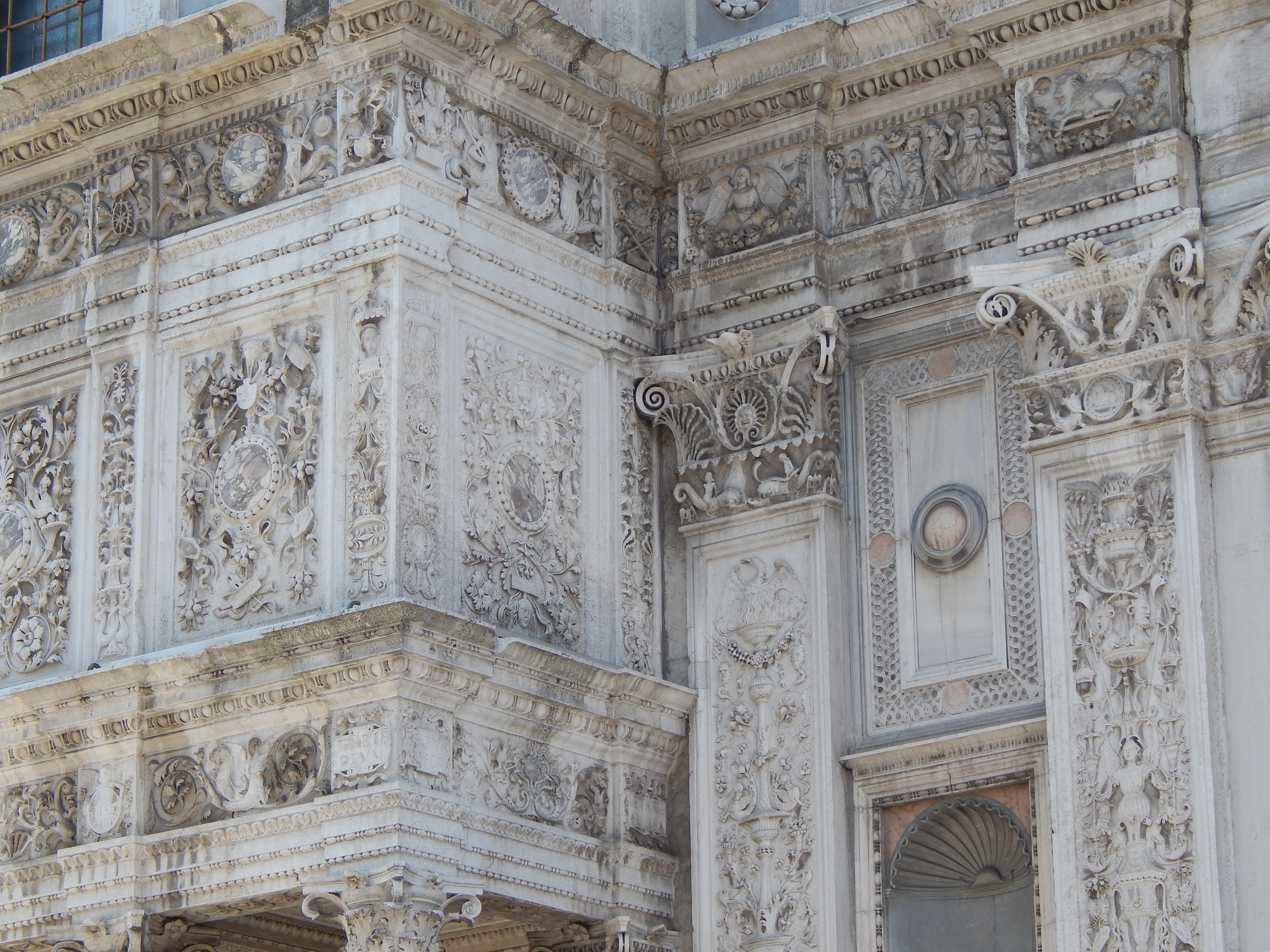
Detail of the facade of the Santa Maria dei Miracoli (end of 15th century)

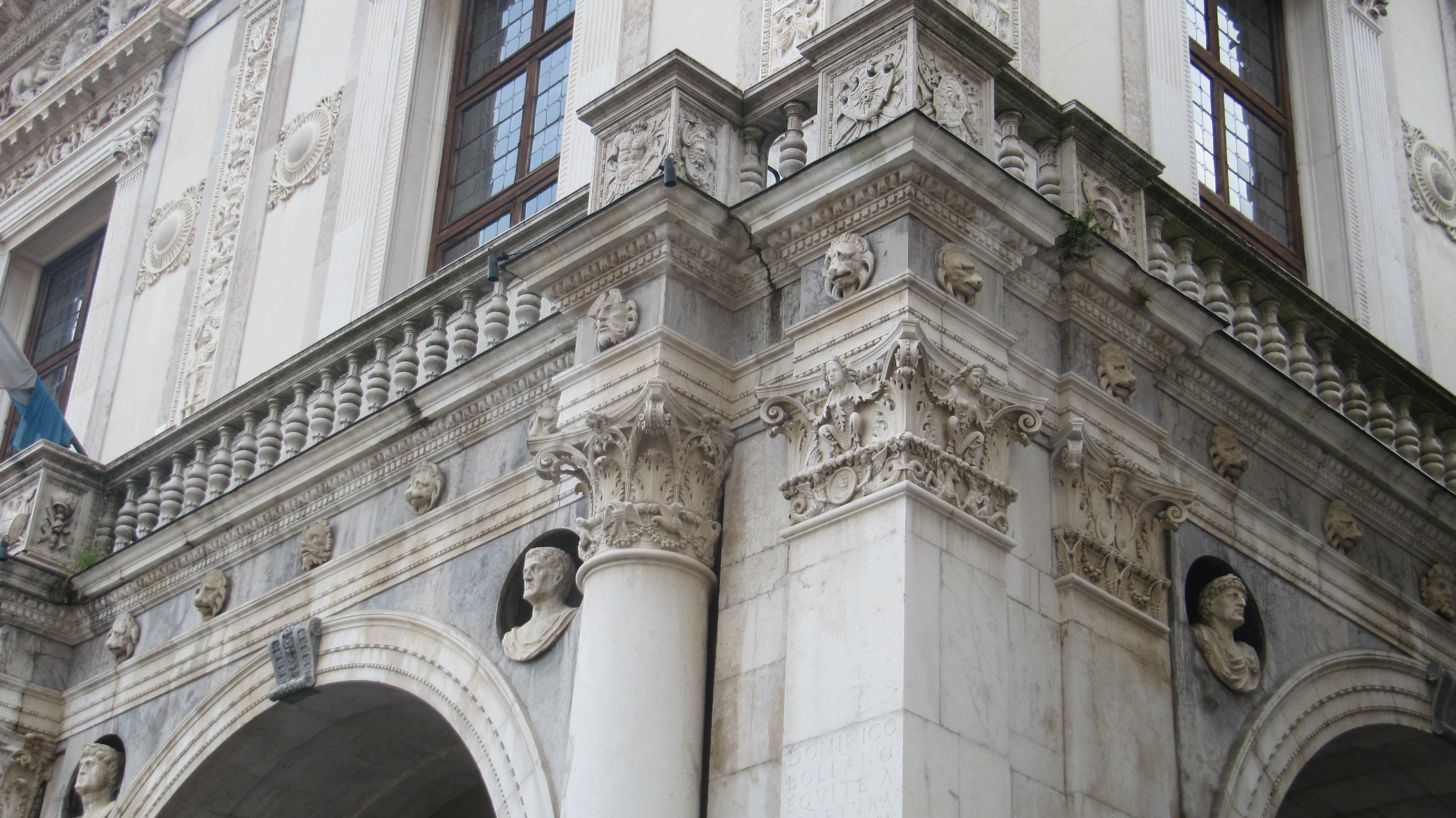
Detail of the facade of the Loggia palace (1495–1505)

The sculptors very likely also operated in Brescia because Bartolomeo was known to have resided there at least between 1501 and 1503, (Note: In support of this thesis, there is a direct source, specifically a 1503 deed from Brescia that asserts Bartolomeo as a Brescian resident; an indirect reference is the Veronese registry office that lists (in 1501 and 1502) Paolo Sanmicheli as a son of Bartolomeo de Brixia. See Zani 2010, p. 93, note 30.) and such a long presence can be justified only by admitting the existence of significant local commissions. There is reason to believe that the Sanmicheli organisation should have deeper roots in Brescia during the two years mentioned, ranging from the construction of dei Miracoli to that of the Loggia. (Note: The Sanmicheli, according to the interpretation of the historical sources of the time, would be the designers and site managers of the facade of the sanctuary of Miracoli (see the former Historical Archive of Santa Maria dei Miracoli, today the Brunelli Archive in the parochial registry of Bassano Bresciano, not accessible, mazzo 1, n. 1, see Guerrini 1930, pp. 211–218 for a transcription); several works of the Loggia (Baldassarre Zamboni, Collectanea de rebus Brixiae, Queriniana Library, Ms. H. III. 2 M.). The identification, in this case, is also based on a variety of stylistic and documentary evidence as reported by Giorgio Vasari in his Lives on Jacopo Sanmicheli. See Zani 2010, pp. 93–94 and notes to the text.) With the Loggia, however, the mature talent of Cairano broke into the Brescian art scene, and his powerful sculptural sequence of the Caesars testifies to the decline of the Sanmicheli, whose ornate style was no longer of interest to the municipality and nobility.

In possibly the last years of the 15th century, the Sanmicheli were involved in the stone decoration of the Caprioli chapel in the Church of San Giorgio, for which Cairano, almost simultaneously, prepared his Adoration, demonstrating for the first time outside of the Loggia a cooperation between the two studios. Bartolomeo Sanmicheli, at the beginning of the new century, attempted at this point to make a comeback in the local art scene with the Ark of San Tiziano of 1505, characterized by a strong decorative quality. He possibly also aspired to the commission of the ark of Sant'Apollonio, which had been up for grabs since the discovery of the relics of the holy bishop in 1503. An early involvement of Sanmicheli can be surmised in the Martinengo mausoleum, but the commission was awarded to Bernardino dei Crossi in 1503. However, based on the prevailing decorative nature of the monument, which is much more rigorously classical, it can be attributed to Cairano.

Again about 1505 the rebuilding of the church of San Pietro in Oliveto began, a commission probably won by Sanmicheli. Note that the reliefs are the only figurative works there, in addition to the fine carvings on pilasters and frames of the chapels, a specialism of the Sanmicheli that no longer met contemporary tastes. The ultimate answer from Gasparo not long in coming: with the ark of Sant'Apollonio of 1508, he established once and for all his artistic superiority, which was by then certainly much more preferred by the Brescian clientele.

Around this time, perhaps because of the great and definitive works from Cairano, the Sanmicheli left Brescia, never to return. In Casale Monferrato, Bartolomeo died two years later. Matteo, who started alongside his father, continued and ended his career in Piedmont, near Turin, where he left many of his better known works.

=== Relations with Tamagnino ===
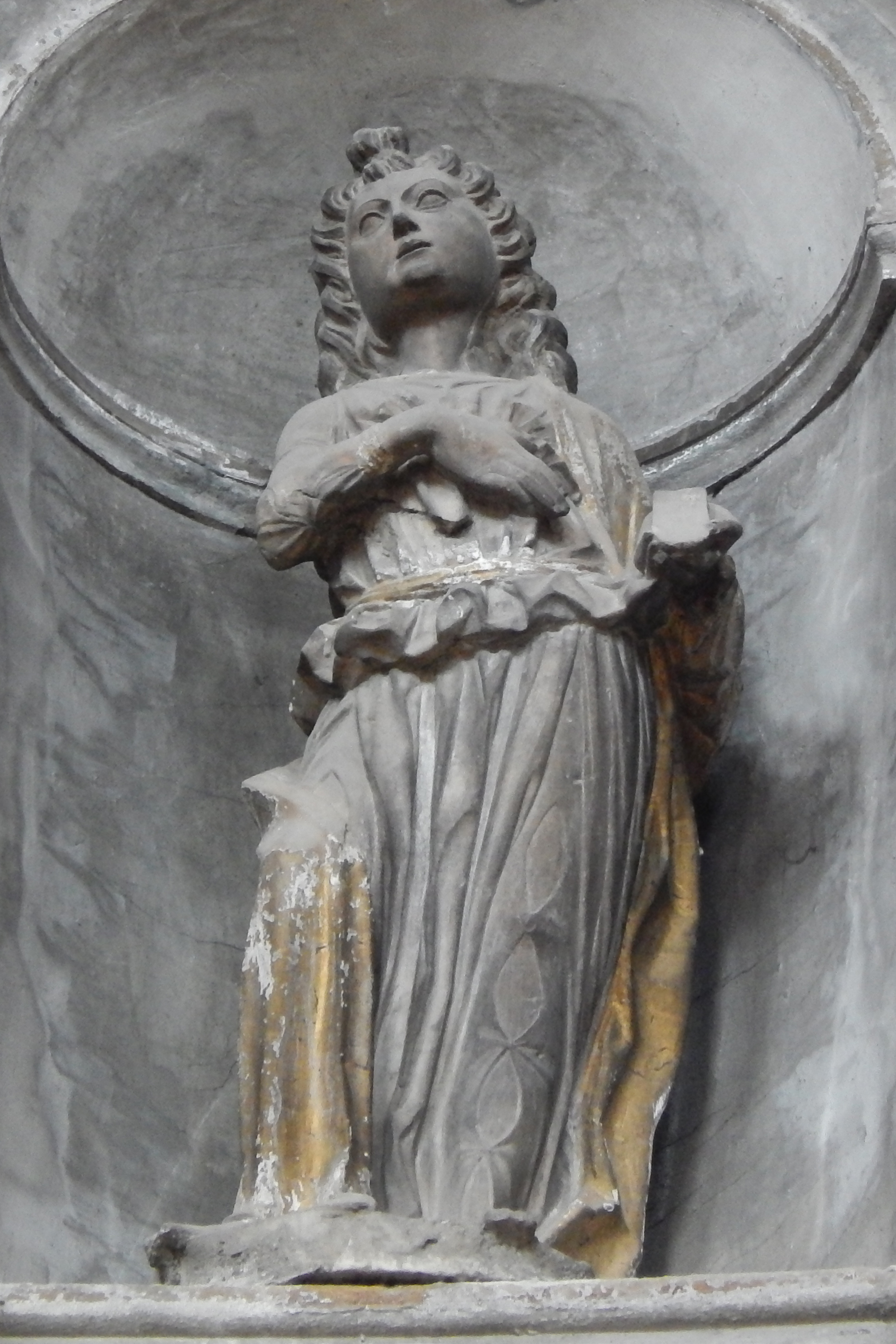
Tamagnino, Angel (1489)

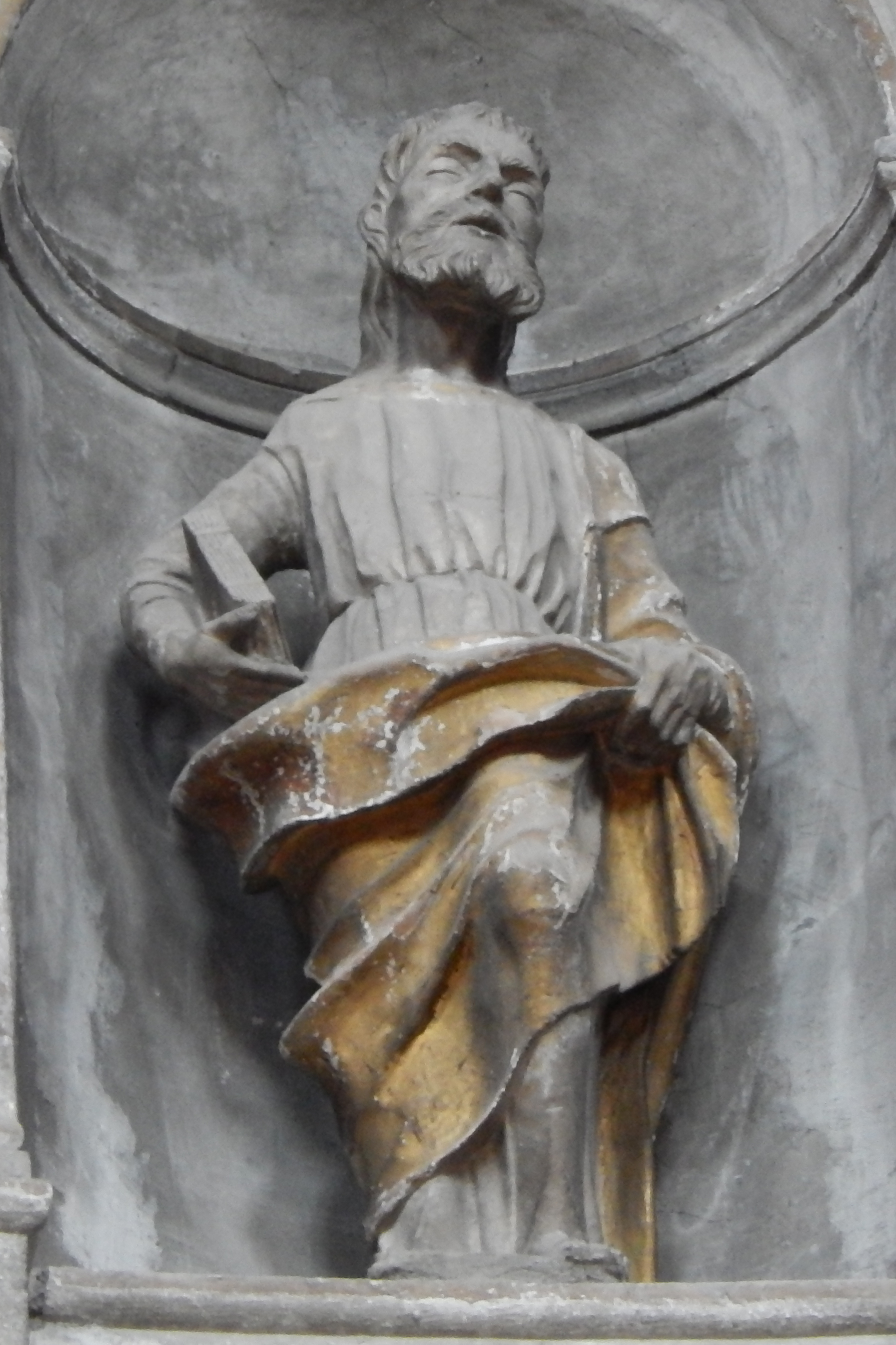
Gasparo Cairano, Apostle (1489)

A similar, strong competition was established very probably between Gasparo Cairano and Antonio della Porta (Tamagnino), who debuted in Brescia (in documentary terms) along with Cairano with his cycle of twelve Angels for the first dome of the Santa Maria dei Miracoli, between 24 December 1489 and 3 May 1490. It is not clear what brought this Milanese artist to Brescia. He belonged to a family of sculptors, and between 1484 and 1489 was known to have worked in Milan and Pavia for the Sforza, in close contact with Giovanni Antonio Amadeo. His debut as a figurative sculptor at the Santa Maria dei Miracoli, however, owed to the Sanmicheli, who typically specialized in the field of decorative sculpture and lacked outside of this field. Note that Gasparo Cairano himself also first appeared on the art scene as a figurative sculptor under the Sanmicheli: he created his sequence of twelve Apostles at the same project.

The colocation of the Angels and Apostles as well as the affinity between them suggest that both Tamagnino and Cairano obtained early ownership of the internal works at the Santa Maria dei Miracoli, though at the end, it devolved to Cairano. Technically, however, the Angels of Tamagnino are far superior to the Apostles. In addition to the Angels, Tamagnino also delivered four busts for the pendentive of the first dome of the church, titled Dottori della Chiesa, (Note: Historical sources for the attribution of these works are not unanimous. The Martinengo memorial of 1731 (see Guerrini 1930, pp. 189–218) ascribe the three medallions of St. Ambrose, St. Augustine and St. Jerome to Tamagnino, while Sala (see Sala, p. 90.) attributes the fourth, San Gregorio, although critical stylistic analysis excludes it. See also Zani 2010, p. 98, note 59, and p. 121.) and two smaller roundels for the frieze of the nave. But for these constructions, three of which were monumental, and the Angels, the sculptor received a smaller compensation than Cairano did for his Apostles. (Note: Gasparo Cairano is paid nine lire for each statue of the Apostles, for a total of 108 lire, while Tamagnino receives 106 lire for the twelve Angels and the five reliefs. See the transcription by Guerrini 1930, pp. 209–210. of the lost document in Archivio Storico di Santa Maria dei Miracoli, cart. A, fasc. 3.)

Tamagnino is known to have left Brescia while the construction of the sanctuary was ongoing, evidently finding his work undervalued and underpaid. The reasons for the bias are unclear, but it is possible that Cairano enjoyed local favour, especially from the directors of the company commissioning the shrine, which allowed him to prevail over Tamagnino despite the latter's technical superiority. Tamagnino then won the prestigious contract for the façade of the Certosa of Pavia, to be installed under the aegis of Father Amedeo and Antonio Mantegazza. The corporate pact between the artist and the two sculptors strengthened in May 1492, providing Tamagnino with a unique training experience as well as a remarkable leap in his career.

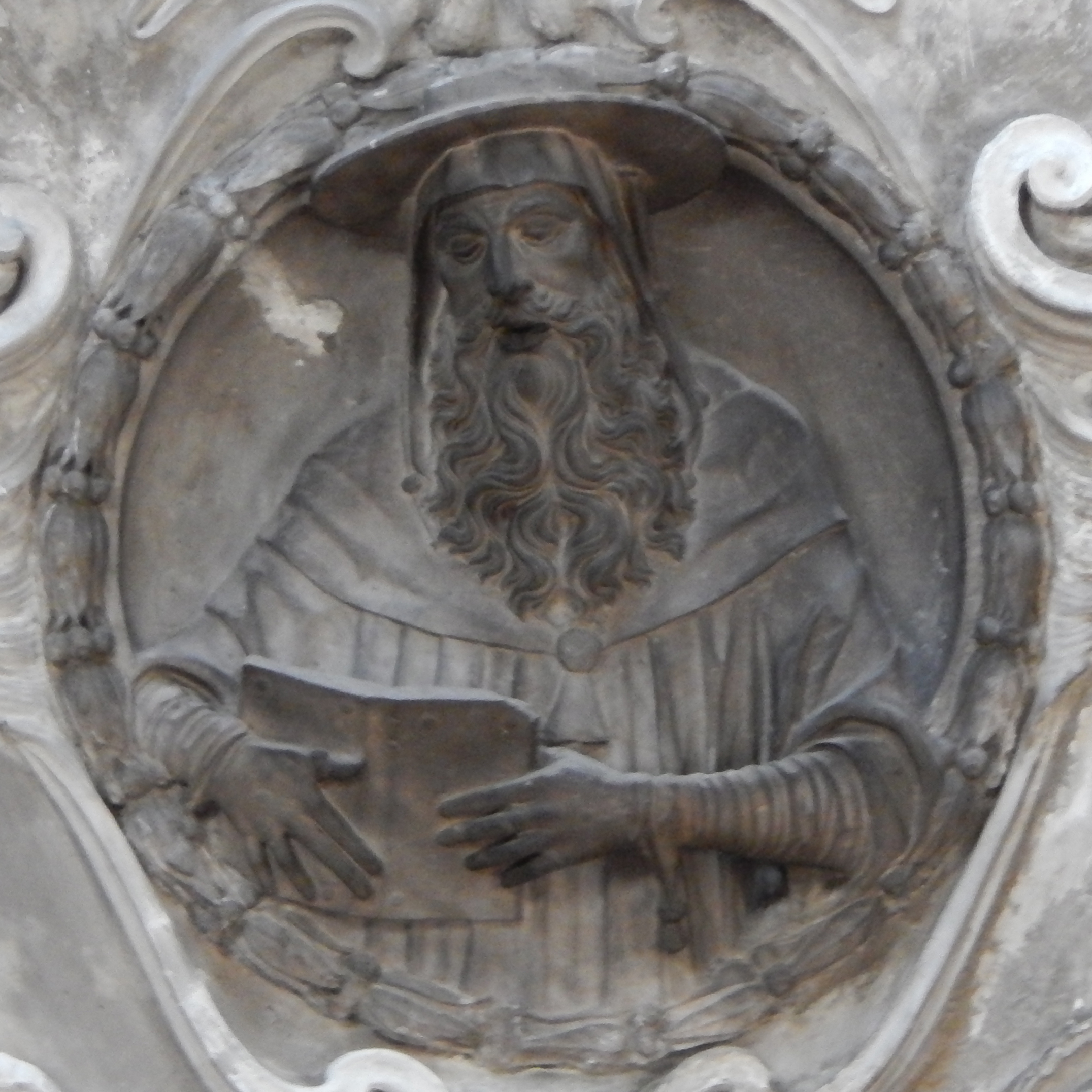
Tamagnino, San Girolamo (c. 1490)

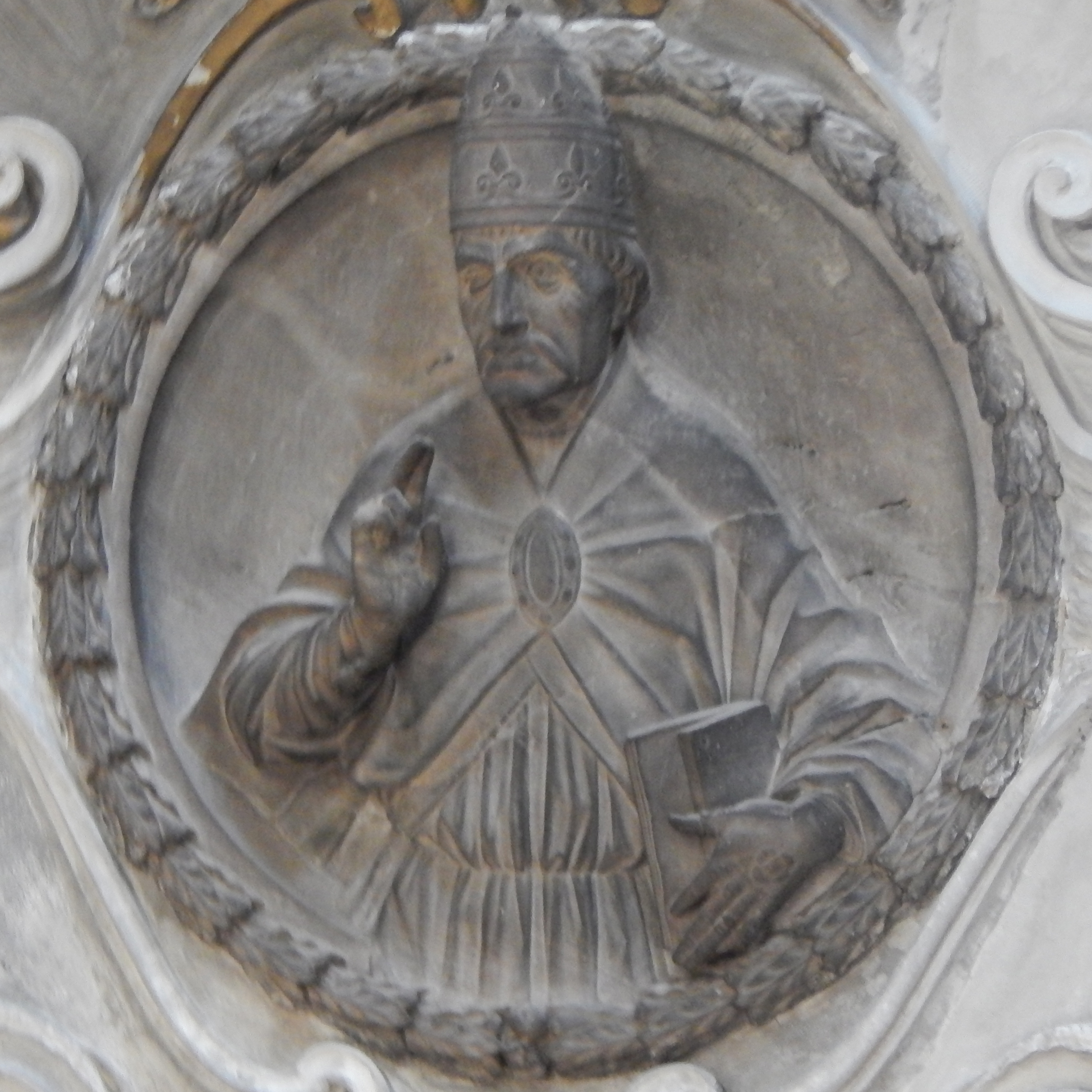
Gasparo Cairano, San Gregorio (c. 1495–1500)

In 1499 the Duchy of Milan was conquered by the French, causing a diaspora of artists from the city to all of northern Italy and beyond. Perhaps this is the reason for the return of Tamagnino to Brescia. A tantalising project was the commission of the Palazzo della Loggia, in which he participated between November 1499 and June 1500. Sculptural works that had begun at the Loggia in 1492, when Tamagnino had left Brescia, were now the hegemony of Gasparo Cairano, for some years considered as a court sculptor by the Brescian grandees, both public and private.

The two artists, therefore, a decade after their mutual debut, now returned to compete for the most prestigious commission in Brescia of the moment. Tamagnino's qualification, almost unique, was to have performed much of the decoration on the marble facade of the Certosa of Pavia, while Gasparo Cairano leveraged a spectacular leap of artistic quality, which had already produced the first Caesars at the public Palazzo.

Extant documentation makes it possible to follow the competition more clearly than in the case of the shrine dei Miracoli, and the delivered works, their dates and respective payments lend themselves to interesting analyses. By Tamagnino's arrival in 1499, Cairano already had delivered at least five different Caesars and other stone material, but only a payment for a single bust is documented, because his attention was completely taken up with two gigantic angular trophies that he had recently begun. In November 1499, Tamagnino delivered four Caesars and three leonine busts, which showcased his calibre and scale of production.

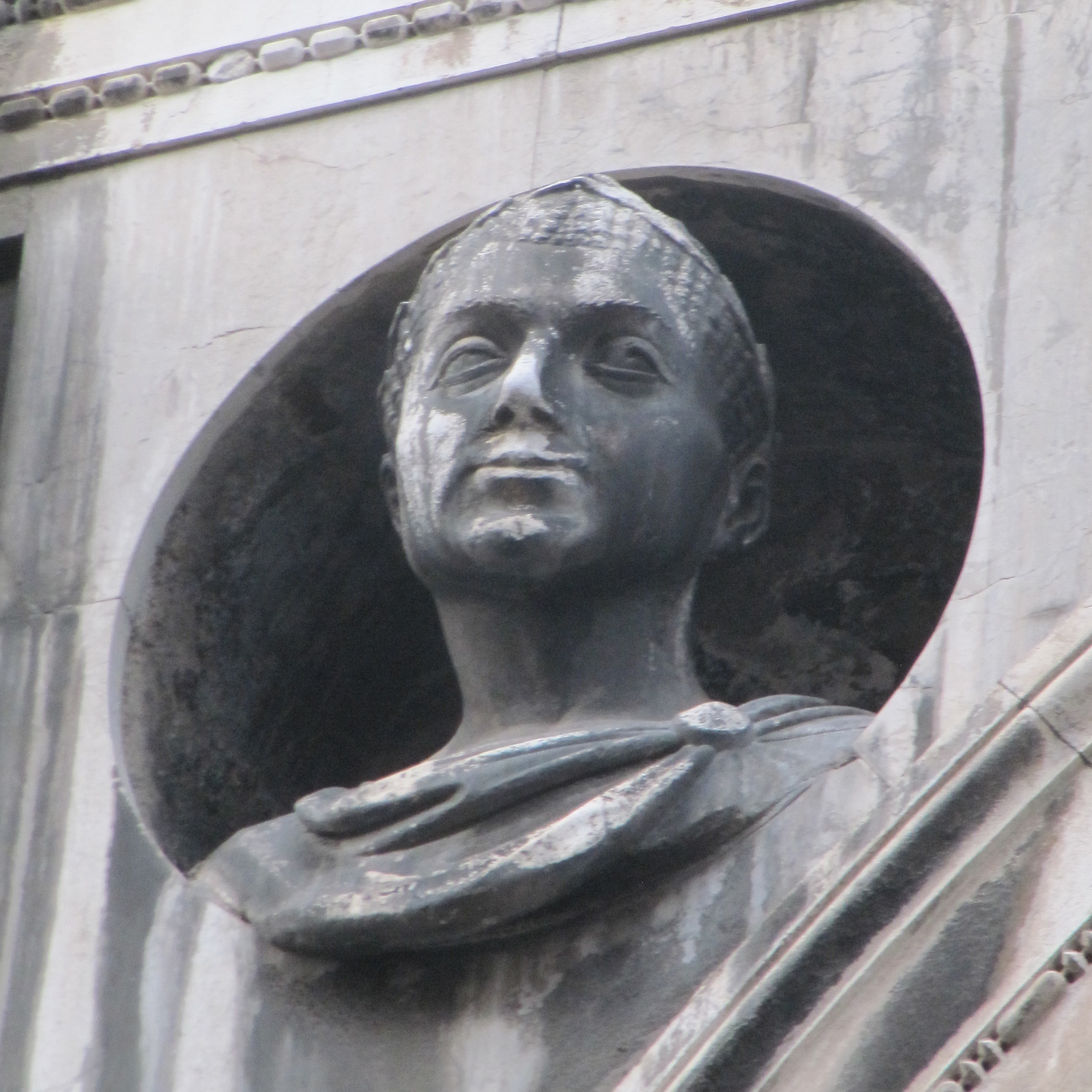
Tamagnino, Caesar (1499–1500)

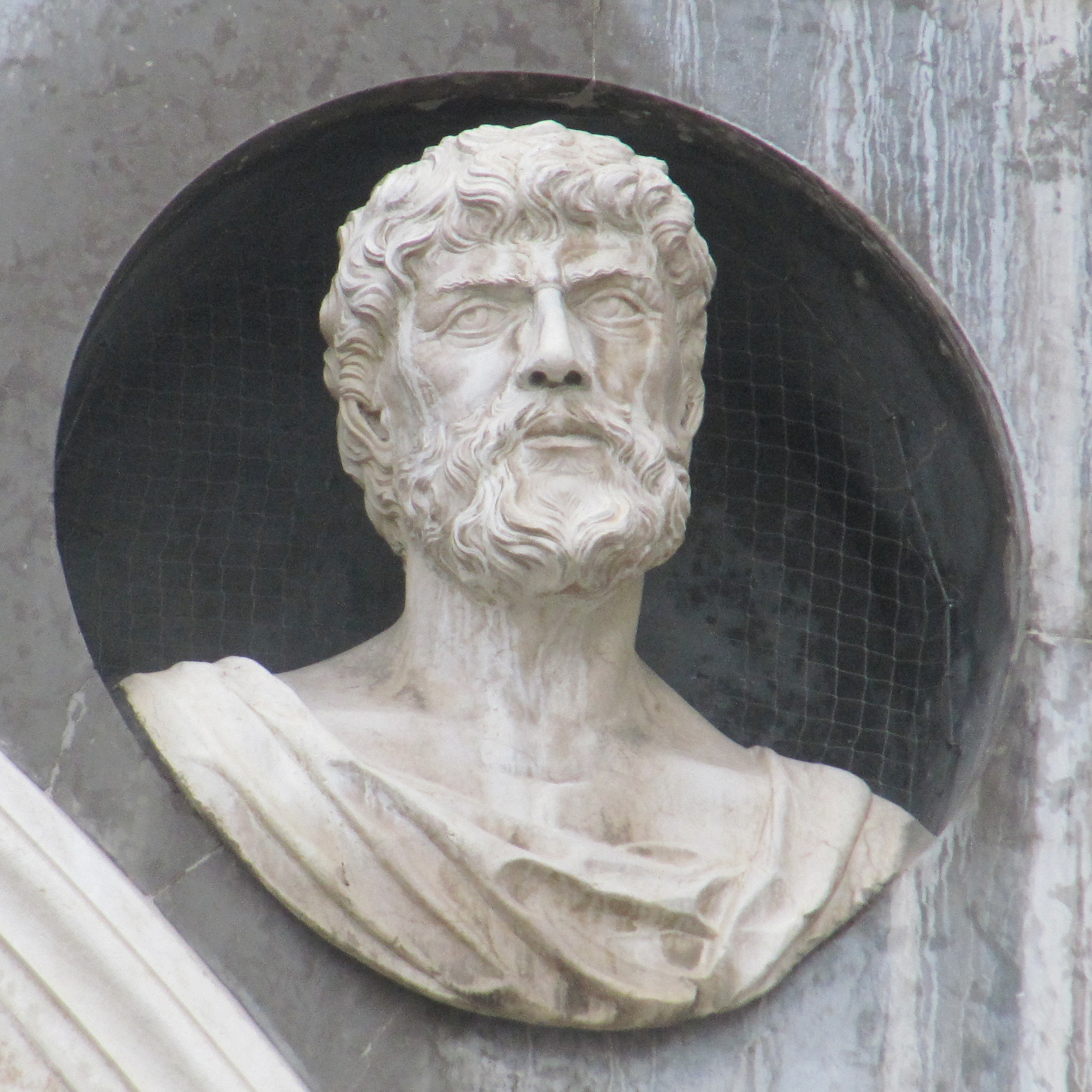
Gasparo Cairano, Caesar (c. 1495)

But in the following seven months, Cairano records successive advances and balances for trophies in full production mode that does not affect his other works, whereas Tamagnino only realises two Caesars and seventeen leonine busts. The creation of leonine busts was considered repetitive and could be consigned to low calibre stonecutters, and Tamagnino was paid much less than the average payment received by Cairano for artefacts of the same type. (Note: By way of comparison, note that twenty soldi made a Venetian lira; on 27 May 1500, Tamagnino was paid forty-five soldi (just over two lire each) for his eight leonine protome. For the same artefacts, Gaspare da Carsogna, a stonecutter, received three lire each, Iacopo Campione received two lire, and Girolamo di Canonica got three lire, while Gasparo Cairano was paid eight lire for each protome virile delivered. This information comes from Baldassare Zamboni, Collectanea de rebus Brixiae, Biblioteca Queriniana, Ms. H. III. M. 2.)

Tamagnino's six Caesars were relegated to the less frequented areas of the building – at the back and the south and west. The sixth bust was of poorer quality than the rest of the cycle, and it is surmised that Tamagnino aimed to taunt his clients who for the second time in Brescia had undervalued his ability and underestimating his work. After these events, Tamagnino abandoned Brescia, probably never to return, leaving Cairano as the main sculptural worker in the city.

== Critical oblivion ==
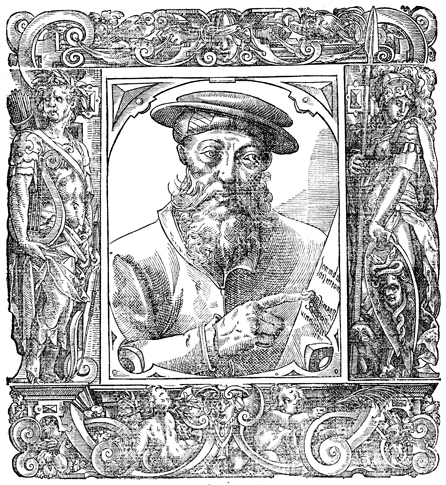
Portrait of Pomponio Gaurico, the first scholar to commend Cairano's oeuvre during the artist's life, in 1504

Despite the modernity and the merit of the works produced and the ability of its protagonists, the historiography of Renaissance sculpture in Brescia was never able to win the honors of artistic and literary culture, neither at the time, nor in the following centuries, being forgotten even by the local sources. The main cause is to be found in a long series of errors and omissions that occurred in the critical literature from the earliest days until the twentieth century, which led to the misunderstanding of the cultural level and quality achieved by the Brescia school during the thirty years from the turn of the fifteenth century, and the oblivion of its main characters.

The main contributor to the critical oblivion was the loss of archival documents (Note: In particular, the records of the City of Brescia related to the construction site of the Loggia have been lost, as also the archive of the church of Santa Maria dei Miracoli, the entire documentation of the construction site of San Pietro in Oliveto, the details of the commission of the Martinengo mausoleum, and the ark of Sant'Apollonio and the papers of the Caprioli family. There are many different reasons as to the loss of each archive: see the bibliography cited in support of individual works of art.) or, indeed, the artwork itself, often dismembered if not destroyed. Only in the second half of the twentieth century, supported by new studies and the rediscovery of archival sources, has the mastery of Gasparo Cairano been revealed. While a catalog of his works of art has been reconstructed within the framework of the Renaissance in Brescia, the full story still suffers from gaps and there are still events to be clarified.

== Works ==
Cairano's career covers just over two decades (circa 1490–1510), a relatively short period, during which, moreover, the majority of works produced is concentrated in the latter decade. Among these, nearly three-quarters are religious commissions, executed mainly because of the greater funding available from such sources and the increased likelihood of their conservation over time. Numerous sculptures also stemmed from private commissions, especially funerary tombs, as well as secular cycles such as that of the Caesars. In many works, there is an evident, and sometimes overwhelming architectural component that indicates the careful preparations made by Cairano in this field. Cairano was lauded, as for example by the municipality of Chiari where he was explicitly named lapicida architectum et ingeniarum optimum.

The fair amount of isolated fragments and sculptures testify to the many lost works and those that reached us only incompletely, which were clearly of considerable artistic merit. None of these are mentioned in archival documents, apart from the sculptures that accompanied the Caprioli Adoration. On the other hand, the chapel in San Pietro de Dom, commissioned to Gasparo Cairano in 1504 is the only documented work of the sculptor that has been completely lost.

== See also ==
- Historiography of Gasparo Cairano

== Notes ==
Notes on the text

== Bibliography ==
=== Sources until the 19th century ===
==== Brescian themes ====
- Faino, Bernardino. Catalogo delle chiese di Brescia (in Italian). Brescia. 1630–1669
- Paglia, Francesco. Il Giardino della Pittura (in Italian). Brescia. 1675–1713
- Zamboni, Baldassarre (1778). Memorie intorno alle pubbliche fabbriche più insigni della città di Brescia raccolte da Baldassarre Zamboni arciprete di Calvisano. Brescia.

==== Other themes ====
- Gaurico, Pomponio (1504). De sculptura. Florence.
- Vasari, Giorgio (1568). Le vite de' più eccellenti pittori, scultori e architettori. Florence.

=== Sources after the 19th century ===
==== Gasparo Cairano ====
- Agosti, Giovanni (1995). "Intorno ai Cesari della Loggia di Brescia". In Frati, Vasco; Gianfranceschi, Ida; Robecchi, Franco (eds.). La Loggia di Brescia e la sua piazza. Evoluzione di un fulcro urbano nella storia di mezzo millennio. Brescia: Grafo. ISBN 88-7385-269-6.
- Zani, Vito (December 2001). "Gasparo Cairano. Madonna col Bambino". Spunti per Conversare (5). Milan: Galleria nella Longari.
- Zani, Vito (2010). Gasparo Cairano. Roccafranca: La Compagnia della Stampa. ISBN 978-88-8486-400-0.

==== Renaissance arts in Brescia ====
- Boselli, Camillo (1977). Regesto artistico dei notai roganti in Brescia dall'anno 1500 all'year 1560. Brescia.
- Frati, Vasco; Gianfranceschi, Ida; Robecchi, Franco, eds. (1995). La Loggia di Brescia e la sua piazza. Evoluzione di un fulcro urbano nella storia di mezzo millennio. Brescia: Grafo. ISBN 88-7385-269-6.
- Peroni, Adriano (1963). "Storia di Brescia". In Giovanni Treccani degli Alfieri (ed.). L'architettura e la scultura nei secoli XV e XVI. Brescia: Treccani.
- Ragni, Elena Lucchesi; Gianfranceschi, Ida; Mondini, Maurizio, eds. (2003). Il coro delle monache – Cori e corali, catalogo della mostra. Milan: Skira. ISBN 88-8491-533-3.
- Rossi, Francesco (1977). "Maffeo Olivieri e la bronzistica bresciana del '500". Arte Lombarda (47/48).
- Zani, Vito (2003). "Sulle nostalgie di Ambrogio Mazzola, scultore bresciano del Cinquecento". Civiltà Bresciana (XII, 1). Brescia.
- Zani, Vito (2007). "Sulle tracce dei Sanmicheli a Brescia e Mantova, tra Quattro e Cinquecento". In Matteo Ceriana (ed.). Tullio Lombardo. Scultore e architetto nella cultura artistica veneziana del Rinascimento. Venice. ISBN 978-88-8314-452-3.
- Zani, Vito (2011). "Maestri e cantieri nel Quattrocento e nella prima metà del Cinquecento". In Valerio Terraroli (ed.). Scultura in Lombardia. Arti plastiche a Brescia e nel Bresciano dal XV al XX secolo. Milan: Skira. ISBN 978-88-572-0523-6.
- Zani, Vito (2012). "Un marmo lombardo del Rinascimento e qualche precisazione sulla scultura lapidea a Brescia tra Quattro e Cinquecento". Antiqua.
- Zani, Vito (2013). "Una copia del Sacrificio del Mausoleo Martinengo e alcune note iconografiche e stilistiche". Antiqua.

==== Other Renaissance themes ====
- Adorno, Pietro (1991). Il Verrocchio. Nuove proposte nella civiltà artistica del tempo di Lorenzo il Magnifico. Firenze: Edam. ISBN 88-7244-001-7.
- Bode, Wilhelm (1906). Die italienische Bronzestatuetten der Renaissance. Berlin.
- Brentano, Carrol (1989). Dizionario biografico degli italiani. Vol. 37 (voce). Rome: Treccani. ISBN 978-88-12-00032-6.
- Burnett, Andrew M.; Schofield, Richard V. (1997). "The Medallions of the Basamento of the Certosa di Pavia. Sources and Influence". Arte Lombarda (120).
- Caglioti, Francesco (2008). "Fifteenth-century reliefs of ancient emperors and empresses in Florence: production and collecting". In Penny, Nicholas; Schmidt, Eike D. (eds.). Collecting sculpture in early modern Europe. New Haven: Yale University Press. ISBN 978-0-300-12160-5.
- Ferrari, M.; Zanata, I. (1991). "Storia e arte religiosa a Mantova. Visite di Pontefici e la reliquia del Preziosissimo Sangue". La cappella del "Sangue de Christo" nella cattedrale di Mantova. Mantua: Casa del Mantegna.
- Fittschen, Klaus (1985). "Memoria dell'antico nell'arte italiana". In Settis, Salvatore (ed.). Sul ruolo del ritratto antico nell'arte italiana. Turin: Einaudi.
- Meyer, Alfred Gotthold (1900). Oberitalienische Frührenaissance. Bauten und Bildwerke der Lombardei. Berlin.
- Schofield, Richard V.; Shell, James; Sironi, Grazioso, eds. (1989). Giovanni Antonio Amadeo. Documents. Como: New press. ISBN 88-95383-49-4.

==== Other Brescian themes ====
- Fisogni, Fiorenzo (2011). "Scultori e lapicidi a Brescia dal tardo classicismo cinquecentesco al rococò". In Terraroli, Valerio (ed.). Scultura in Lombardia. Arti plastiche a Brescia e nel Bresciano dal XV al XX secolo. Milan: Skira. ISBN 978-88-572-0523-6.
- Franchi, Monica, ed. (2002). Le pergamene dell'Archivio Capitolare. Catalogazione e regesti. Travagliato.
- Guerrini, Paolo (1926). "Iscrizioni delle chiese di Brescia. Chiesa e chiostri di San Francesco". Commentari dell'Ateneo di Brescia per l'anno 1925.
- Guerrini, Paolo (1930). "Memorie storiche della diocesi di Brescia". Il Santuario civico dei Miracoli. Vol. I. Brescia: Moretto.
- Ibsen, Monica (1999). Il duomo di Salò. Gussago: Vannini.
- Sala, Alessandro (1834). Pitture ed altri oggetti di belle arti in Brescia. Brescia.
