= Tomb of Gaspare Brunelli =

The Tomb of Gaspare Brunelli
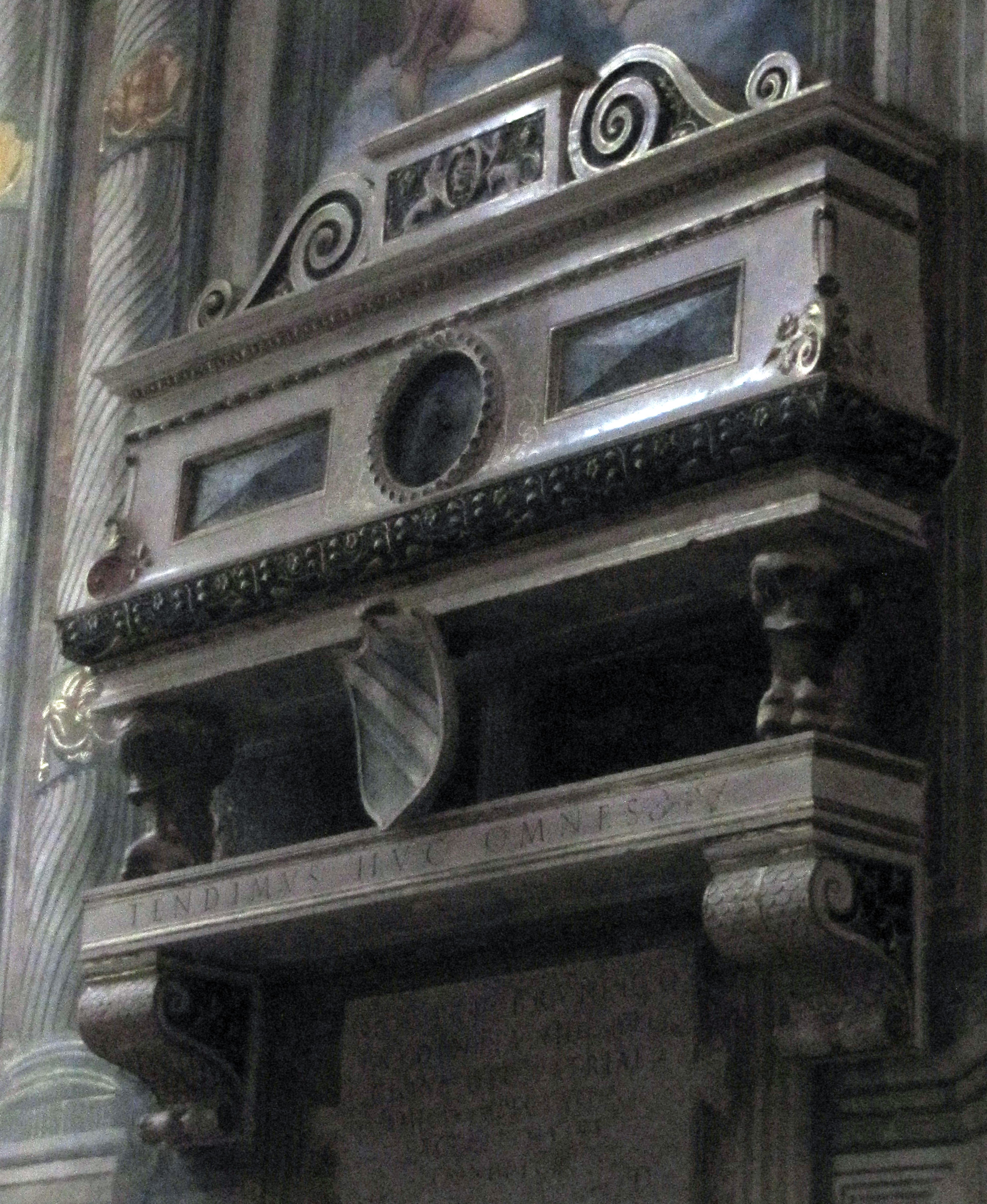
- Artist: Gasparo Cairano
- Completion date: 1500
- Medium: Marble
- Movement: Renaissance
- Location: Church of St Francis of Assisi, Brescia

The Tomb of Gaspare Brunelli is a funerary monument in partially painted and gilded marble by Gasparo Cairano, dating to 1500, and situated in the Sacred Heart chapel of the Church of St Francis of Assisi, Brescia.

== History ==
In 1494, Gasparo Cairano received a commission to work on the chapel of the Magdalene in the church of St Francis, Brescia, from the prior of its convent, Francesco Sanson. That same year, some embellishment began to the chapel (today dedicated to the Sacred Heart) as part of a wider renovation of the entire church promoted by Sanson. (In 1499, Sanson's last will decreed the construction of the monumental cross of St Francis, one of the major masterpieces of Brescian jewellery of the time.)

At the beginning of the twentieth century, Paolo Guerrini found in the Brunelli family archive in Bassano Bresciano some unspecified documents, according to which it appears that the mausoleum was completed in 1496 by M. Gaspare of Milan. The date 1500 is engraved on the tomb, making it likely that Guerrini's document constituted the contract for execution. While Guerrini does not mention the client's name, it is likely it is the Gaspare Brunelli who died on 10 April 1497.

The monument has never changed its location over the centuries, but it has lost its central medallion and probably also sculptural cymatium that was to adorn the upper pedestal.

== Description and style ==
Guerrini, in 1926, identified the document's M. Gaspare of Milan, the creator of the tomb, as Gaspare Pedoni. This was caused by a historic confusion by Giorgio Vasari of identity between two eponymous sculptors in the sixteenth century. In 1954, however, Tonolini and Monegatti identified the sculptor as Gasparo Cairano, an attribution that has been accepted by subsequent historiography and reiterated by Vito Zani in 2010.

Zani hypothesized the original presence of further sculptures to decorate the sepulchre, later lost, observing how the upper pedestal appears today as an unused support surface, and suggesting that sacred figures such as a resurrected Christ or a representation of Virtue could be possible placements. The gap in the central medallion of the funerary chest, originally meant to house a decorative round, was more evident: a coloured spherical marble or a figurative or heraldic relief that could also be in bronze.

The funeral monument is conceived and built on lines of austere elegance, with sober and very dense decorative motifs underlined by the gilding. Here the sculptor demonstrates and re-elaborates the typology of the mural funeral monument, of Venetian origin, inserting decorative details such as the angular leonine legs that emerge from a helmet. This detail can be found in the contemporary tomb of Melchiorre Trevisan in the Basilica of Santa Maria Gloriosa dei Frari in Venice, dated 1500 and attributed to the studio of Lorenzo Bregno.

== See also ==
- Gasparo Cairano

== Bibliography ==
- Begni Redona, Pier Virgilio (1994). "Pitture e sculture in San Francesco". La chiesa e il convento di San Francesco in Brescia. Brescia: Banca San Paolo.
- Begni Redona, Pier Virgilio (1997). "Croce processionale di San Francesco". Nel lume del Rinascimento. Brescia: Museo Diocesano di Brescia.
- Guerrini, Paolo (1926). "Iscrizioni delle chiese di Brescia. Chiesa e chiostri di San Francesco". Commentari dell'Ateneo di Brescia per l'Anno 1925.
- Prestini, Rossana (1994). "Documenti e regesto". La chiesa e il convento di San Francesco in Brescia. Brescia: Banca San Paolo.
- Tonolini, Maria; Monegatti, Vittorina (1954). "Storia e arte nel complesso monumentale di san Francesco". Settimo centenario del complesso monumentale di San Francesco d'Assisi. Brescia.
- Zani, Vito (2010). Gasparo Cairano. Roccafranca: La Compagnia della Stampa.
