= Caprioli Chapel =

Chapel in Lombardy, Italy

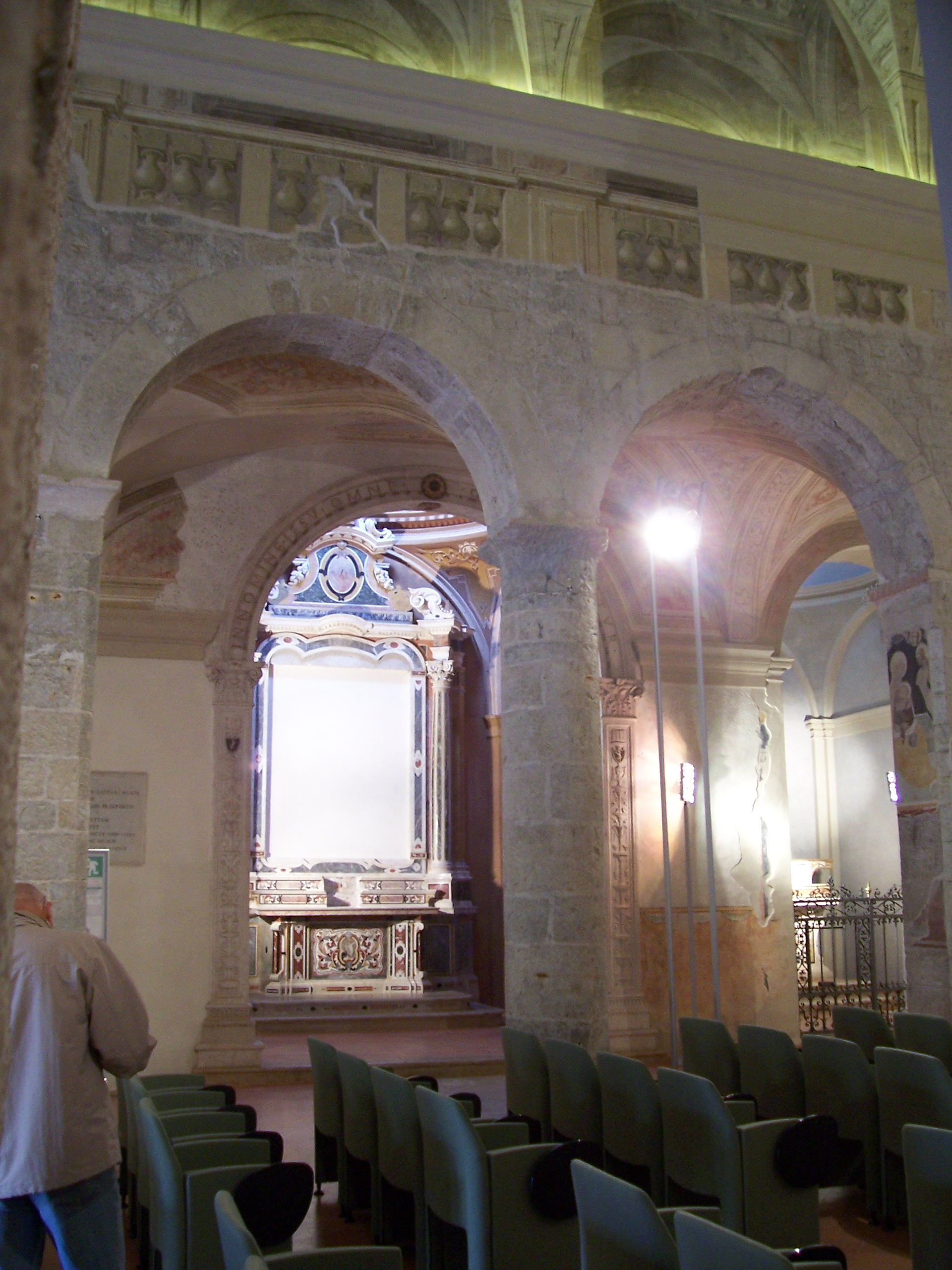
Caprioli Chapel in the central nave of San Giorgio, Brescia

The Caprioli Chapel is the second chapel on the left side of the nave of the Church of San Giorgio in Brescia.

== History ==
The original chapels in the northern nave of the church can be placed in the time following the 13th century foundation of the building, but likely they stem from the fifteenth century. The owners of the second chapel in the counterfacade were the powerful Brescian family of Caprioli. The first arrangement of the chapel according to the new ornamental taste of the period probably dates back to the 1450s: the work was perhaps entrusted to the Sanmicheli workshop, very popular in the city after the erection of the innovative façade of the Church of Santa Maria dei Miracoli, while the funeral monument of Luigi Caprioli dating to 1494, executed by Gasparo Cairano, is installed within. The sculptural outfit of the chapel was completed by at least a figured altarpiece depicting a Madonna with Child among the saints Joseph and Catherine.

During the seventeenth century, the chapel was reorganised along baroque lines, with a new roofing dome built with a lantern. In 1805, the church and the adjoining Franciscan monastery were closed; just before that, the tomb of Luigi Caprioli was dismantled. Its relief, the Caprioli Adoration, ended up in the high altar at the Church of St Francis of Assisi in Brescia, where it is today. The paintings in the chapel were moved to the Diocesan Museum of Brescia. Following the total renovation of the church in 2010, the chapel houses exhibition panels on the history and architectural elements of the church.

== Description ==
The chapel is presented in the 17th century Baroque style, with large panel frescoes in ultramarine and a luminous dome. The altar, of considerable size, is of the same period and inlaid with multicoloured marble, and presents a figurative front. However, the environs are devoid of furniture just as the altar is bare of decoration.

The outer lines of the chapel are worked with fine marble carvings that go up along its arch like a candelabra. This is attributed to the Sanmicheli studio, representing the last remnants of the substantial stone structure that decorated the chapel at the end of the 15th century.

Removed from the chapel, as mentioned earlier, is the Caprioli Adoration, among the masterpieces of Gasparo Cairano. Within the chapel it is possible to place a marble fragment with its ornamental reliefs and bearing the Caprioli coat of arms, now preserved in the sacristy of the church.

The marble altarpiece comprising a Madonna and Child between the saints Joseph and Catherine that adorned the chapel can, according to Bernardino Faino, be traced back to the same master who implemented the chapel ornamentation, namely Gasparo Cairano. Only one other item of this type is known by Cairano, the Kress Altar, currently in the National Gallery of Art in Washington, D.C.

== Bibliography ==
- Faino, Bernardino (1630–1669). Catalogo delle chiese di Brescia. Brescia.
- Zani, Vito (2010). Gasparo Cairano. Roccafranca: La Compagnia della Stampa.
