= Altar of San Girolamo =

Sculptural complex in Brescia, Italy

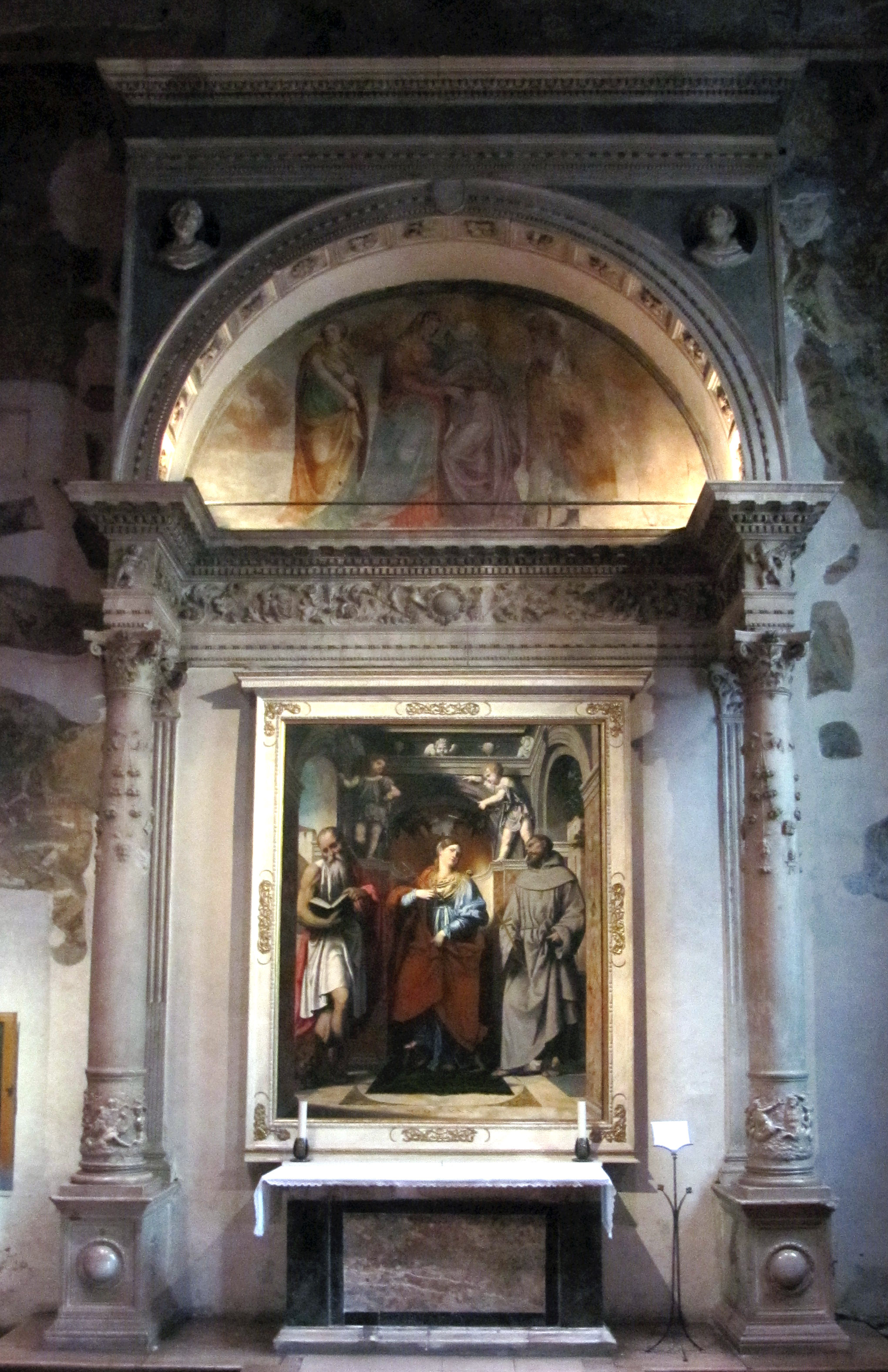
- Artist: Gasparo Cairano, Antonio Medaglia
- Year: 1506
- Medium: Marble
- Movement: Italian renaissance
- Dimensions: 780 cm × 450 cm × 80 cm (310 in × 180 in × 31 in)
- Location: Church of St Francis, Brescia

The Altar of San Girolamo is a sculptural complex in marble, around 780×450×80cm in dimensions, designed and constructed by Gasparo Cairano and Antonio Medaglia, and situated within the Church of St Francis of Assisi in Brescia, Italy. Dated between 1506–1510, it is located in the first chapel on the right side of the nave.

== History ==
The origin and the attribution of this sculptural complex is one of the tricky problems of Brescian renaissance art. As Antonio Morassi observed in 1939, the only useful element to date the work precisely is the effigy of Pope Julius II carved on the inside base of the left column: it is taken from the front of one of the medals by Caradosso and Gian Cristoforo Romano made in honour of that pope around or after 1506. Even the patron of the altar is unknown, as no documents have been found and because of the abrasion of emblems placed on the key of the arch.

The first confirmed testimonies on the altar appear in the 1520s. In 1521, Simone Rovati stipulated a contract with Maffeo Olivieri for a wooden altarpiece to be placed on an unspecified altar within the church. In 1527, the church's provost, Alessandro Averoldi, in a private manuscript, granted a room for rent to the painter Callisto Piazza in exchange for (in addition to rental money) an altarpiece similar in quality to the painting he made for Simon de Roado situated in Saint Francis. This painting by Piazza was later identified as the Madonna and Child between the Saints John the Baptist and Jerome; it was recorded in Brescian guides in the early 17th century, after which it passed to the Lechi Collection in the first half of the 19th century, and was then purchased by the Pinacoteca di Brera in Milan in 1829, where it is found to date.

Records of the apostolic visit of San Carlo Borromeo in 1580 clarify that the first altar on the right side of the nave was indeed the one contracted by Simone Rovati, dedicated to St Mark, and that there was a further endowment, documented by Rovati's testament of 1522 (the date of which is obtained from the records of the apostolic visit). As no St Mark has been found in the specified location, it is clear that between 1520 and 1580, the dedication had changed. These documents, further, do not help in dating the sculpture itself as it obviously predated 1521 and Rovati's patronage, who almost certainly found it already in place. It is also not clear what the altar contained prior to the 1521 contract of the altarpiece to Maffeo Olivieri; there is reason to believe that commission was not completed, and by 1527, Piazza's painting was already there.

Federico Odorici, in 1853, was the first to point out that the St Margaret of Antioch with Two Saints by Moretto, which was historically documented to be in the fifth chapel on the left side of the nave, was evidently moved to the chapel of St Jerome to fill the void left by Piazza's canvas. And finally, the fresco with the Visitation, dated to 1520 and placed in the upper lunette, is one of the few attributed to the catalogue of Francesco Prata of Caravaggio.

== Description and style ==
Alfred Meyer, in 1900, was the first to appraise the altar critically. Appreciating its architectural composition, he deemed it a surprise that there hadn't been better consideration of one of the finest works of the Brescian renaissance. He recognised in the two free columns of the altar, a sculptural adaptation of the Zuffa di dei marini in Mantegna, as well as the relationship between the figures here with those of the decorative medallions of the Martinengo mausoleum. In the busts of the monks on the pendentives, he also found a precise reference to the cycle of Caesars in the Palazzo della Loggia of Brescia, conjecturing that the altar's author could be the same Gaspar Mediolanensis who had been praised by Pomponio Gaurico in 1504 as the creator of the Caesars, and identified by Meyer as Gasparo Cairano.

Antonio Morassi, in 1939, corroborated the connections between this altar and the Martinengo mausoleum, with the consequent attribution of the work to Maffeo Olivieri. This derailed much of the critical study of Brescian architecture for several decades, until the attribution was disproved in 1977 by Boselli. The authorship of Gasparo Cairano of the stone apparatus was reiterated by Vito Zani in the early 21st century as part of a series of studies on the sculptor, with particular reference to the two Monks at the top and the typologies of the figures in the friezes with the Zuffa. Evident affinities from the point of view of the architectural and compositional conception of the altar can also be found in the church of San Pietro in Oliveto, in whose construction Cairano certainly participated with the cycle of Apostles, where the side chapels of the nave are conceived in the same way. The elaborate frieze, of excellent workmanship, is reminiscent of the sculptor's friezes of the same type at the Loggia, also reproduced in the Ark of Sant'Apollonio and in the Martinengo mausoleum. The dating of the altar, therefore, should be close to all these works, including the portal of the cathedral of Salò as proposed in 1991 by Agosti, and therefore placed between 1506 and 1510.

In 2010, Giuseppe Sava published an article in the Arte Veneta journal, which brought to light Antonio Medaglia, a previously unrecognised architect of the church of San Pietro in Oliveto. Sava proposed a catalogue of works including some figures in the frieze, as well as implicating Medaglia in the project of the altar of San Girolamo, albeit as a lesser contributor in his collaboration with Gasparo Cairano.

The same year Vito Zani proposed another reconstruction of the origins of the altar, hypothesising that Mattia Ugoni, the bishop of Famagusta ordained by Pope Julius II in 1504, commissioned it. But Ugoni's patronage is known only after 1519 and linked to the church of San Giuseppe, Brescia, which is documented with regard to Simone Rovati, who had intervened in the altar's construction in 1521. This suggests that Ugoni's patronage of the altar lasted a very short time, leaving little documentary evidence. Zani also links Ugoni with Cairano, as when the former was vicar general in Verona in the early 16th century, he commissioned a portal to the new bishop's palace in that city, which, based on architectural designs, has been attributed to Cairano by Monica Ibsen.

== Details ==
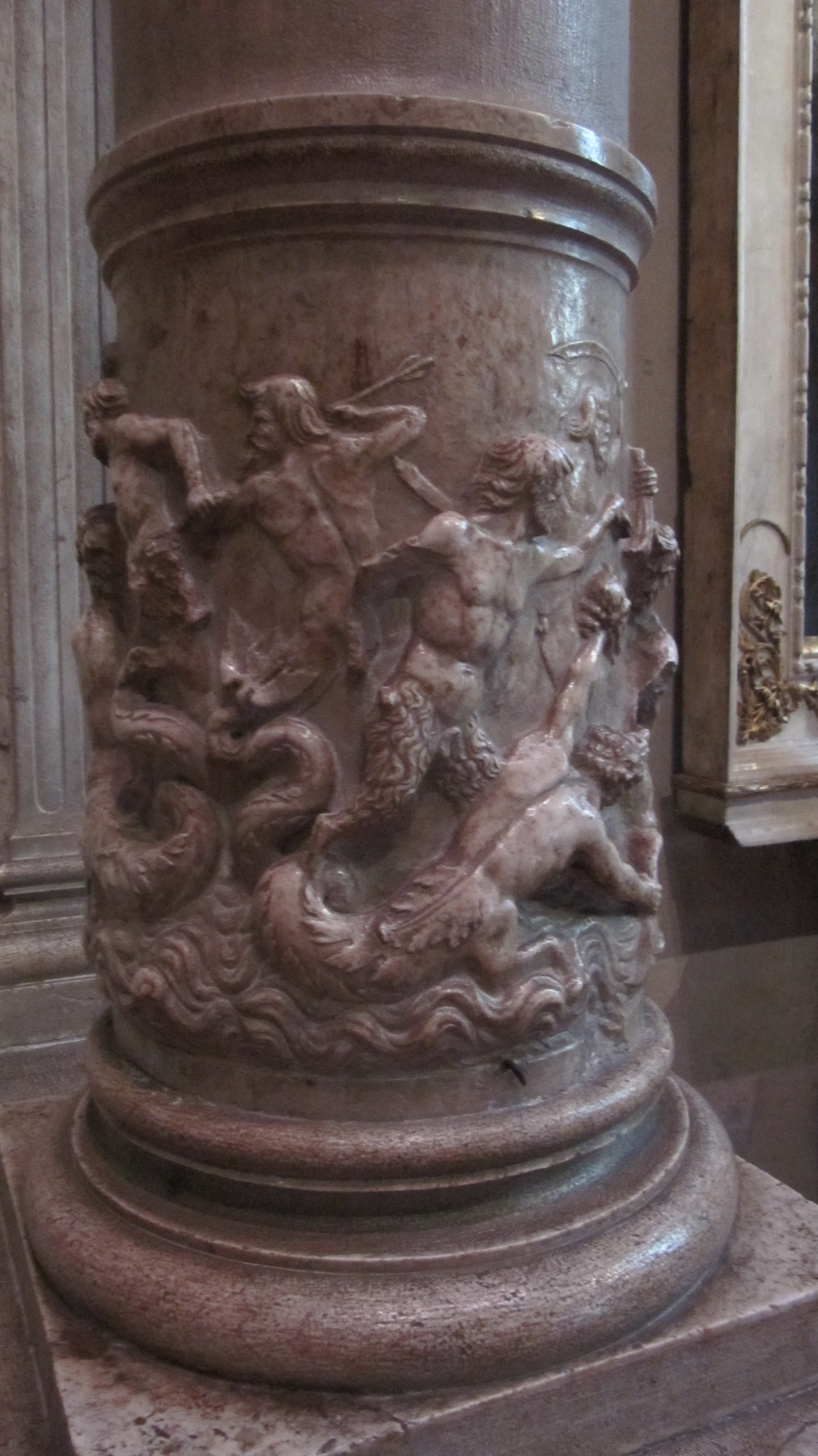
A fight among gods of the sea, detail on the left column.

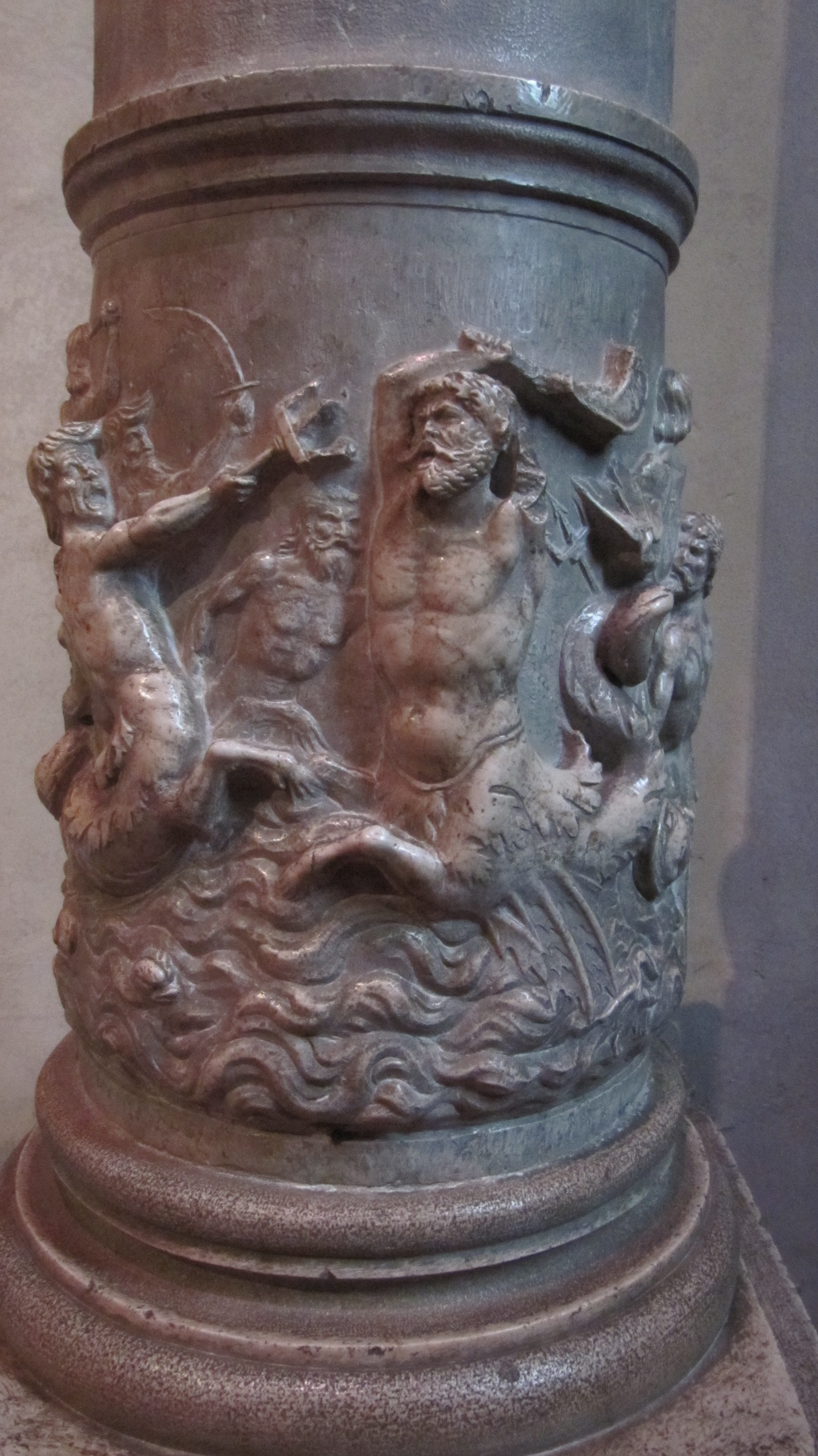
A fight among gods of the sea, detail on the right column.

== Bibliography ==
- Agosti, Giovanni (1995). "La Loggia di Brescia e la sua piazza. Evoluzione di un fulcro urbano nella storia di mezzo millennio". In Vasco Frati; Ida Gianfranceschi; Franco Robecchi (eds.). Intorno ai Cesari della Loggia di Brescia. Brescia: Grafo.
- Begni Redona, Pier Virgilio (1988). Alessandro Bonvicino - Il Moretto da Brescia. Brescia: Editrice La Scuola.
- Boselli, Camillo (1977). Regesto artistico dei notai roganti in Brescia dall'anno 1500 all'anno 1560. Brescia.
- Gaurico, Pomponio (1504). De sculptura. Florence.
- Ibsen, Monica (1999). Il duomo di Salò. Gussago.
- Marubbi, Mario (1989). Gianni Carlo Sciolla (ed.). I Piazza da Lodi. Documenti per i Piazza. Milan.
- Meyer, Alfred Gotthold (1900). Oberitalienische Frührenaissance. Bauten und Bildwerke der Lombardei. Berlin.
- Morassi, Antonio (1939). Catalogo delle cose d'arte e d'antichità d'Italia. Brescia. Rome.
- Odorici, Federico (1853). Storie bresciane dai primi tempi fino all'età nostra narrate da Federico Odorici. Brescia.
- Prestini, Rossana (1994). AA. VV. (ed.). La chiesa e il convento di San Francesco in Brescia. Documenti e regesto. Brescia: Banca San Paolo.
- Sava, Giuseppe (2010). "Antonio Medaglia "lapicida et architecto" tra Vicenza e la Lombardia: il cantiere di San Pietro in Oliveto a Brescia". Arte Veneta (67).
- Tanzi, Marco (1987). "Francesco Prata da Caravaggio: aggiunte e verifiche". Bollettino d'arte (LXXII).
- Zani, Vito (2001). "Gasparo Coirano. Madonna col Bambino". Spunti per Conversare (5). Milan: Galleria Nella Longari.
- Zani, Vito (2010). Gasparo Cairano. Roccafranca: La Compagnia della Stampa.
- Zani, Vito (2012). "Un marmo lombardo del Rinascimento e qualche precisazione sulla scultura lapidea a Brescia tra Quattro e Cinquecento(seconda parte)". Antiqua.
