= Martinengo Mausoleum =

Mausoleum in Brescia, Italy

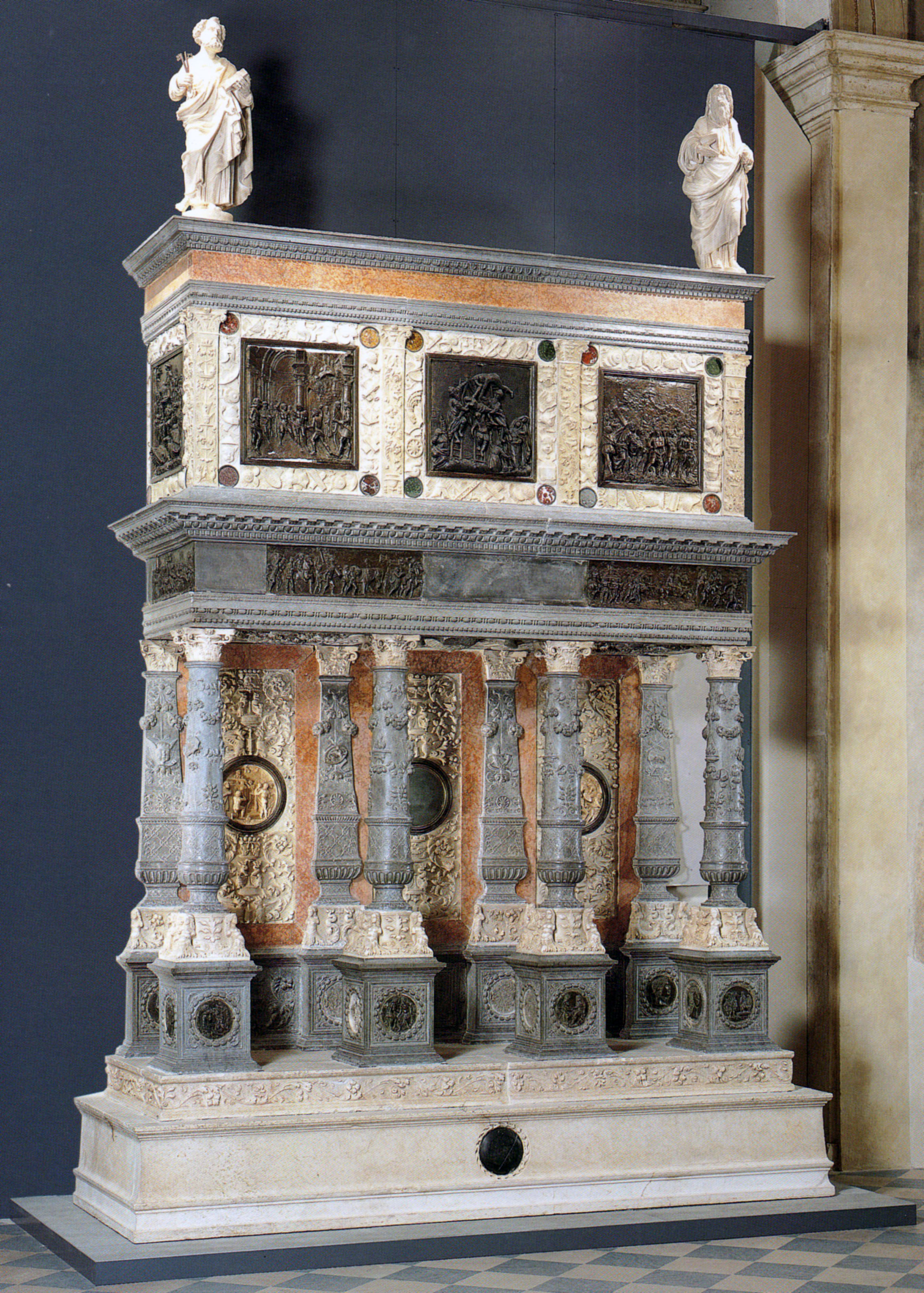
- Artist: Gasparo Cairano, Bernardino delle Croci, Sanmicheli workshop (?)
- Year: 1503-1518
- Medium: Various marbles and bronze
- Dimensions: 465 cm × 360 cm (183 in × 140 in)
- Location: Santa Giulia Museum, Brescia

The Martinengo mausoleum is a funerary monument made through the use of various marbles and bronze (465x360x126 cm) by Gasparo Cairano, Bernardino delle Croci and probably the Sanmicheli workshop, dated between 1503 and 1518 and preserved in the museum of Santa Giulia in Brescia, in the nuns' choir.

The monument, of undisputed artistic and historical value, is one of the most emblematic artifacts attributable to the current of Brescian Renaissance sculpture: the work focuses on architectural and artistic purity, refinement of colors through the use of ancient marbles, many of them probably salvaged, and mythological iconography, the aim of which is the utmost celebration of the deceased for whom the mausoleum is intended.

== Background ==
The origins and dating of the Martinengo mausoleum have constituted perhaps the greatest misunderstanding in the historiography of Brescian Renaissance art, generating in turn another series of errors and erroneous presumptions, first among them the unfounded attribution of the work to Maffeo Olivieri. The real history of the monument, still partially incomplete, has only been known since 1977, due to a discovery made by historian Camillo Boselli: a series of documents in this regard have profoundly distorted the knowledge acquired about the work until then. The following paragraphs, therefore, outline the history of the mausoleum that can actually be reconstructed today on the basis of the documents of the time, mentioning only at a later stage the outdated version.

== History ==
=== The original commission ===
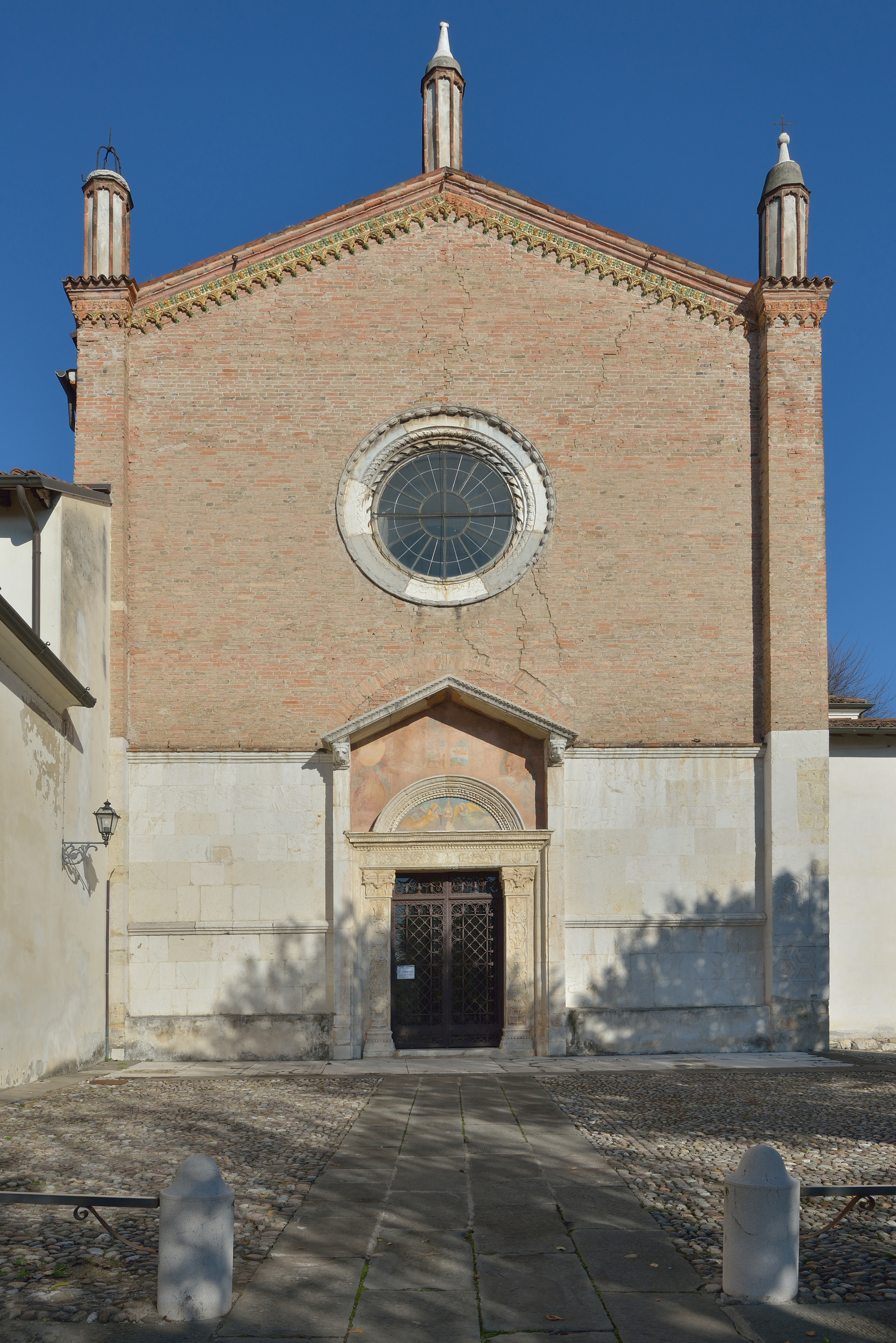
The church of the Most Holy Body of Christ in Brescia.

The original contract for commissioning the mausoleum was made on May 29, 1503, between the two brothers Francesco and Antonio II Martinengo of Padernello and the Brescian goldsmith Bernardino delle Croci. The deed specifies that the monument, to be placed in the Church of the Most Holy Body of Christ, is made in deference to the testamentary will of the father of the two, Bernardino Martinengo of Padernello, who died in 1501 or 1502.

This arrangement, in turn, is contextual to a kind of dynastic tradition initiated by the latter's father, Antonio I Martinengo di Padernello, progenitor of this specific branch of the family. The latter, having financed the work of enlarging the choir of the church of San Francesco d'Assisi in Brescia in 1464, had received from the friars the right to use it exclusively as a burial place, both for himself and for his descendants. However, having renounced this prerogative, he preferred to opt for a more conspicuous solution, such as the construction of a kind of "family church," precisely the church of the Most Holy Body of Christ. The new religious building and the adjoining monastery were built by the Jesuati order, starting around 1467, by almost complete contribution of Martinengo, who left as a testamentary disposition, in 1473, to be buried there. The commission of the mausoleum is therefore to be framed within this single, grand project: to bring together in one place, specially dedicated and designed, the burials of the Martinengo family of Padernello.

The detailed contract describes the features to be assumed by the mausoleum, immediately decreeing a certain artistic value, and a series of details about the materials and some figures such as an "imagibus [...] in forma pietatis" at the top= The document also mentions a project outlined on a sheet of paper, attached to the contract and later lost. The completion of the work was set to take three years, in return for a fee to Delle Croci of 500 ducats, with the possibility of raising it to 600 depending on the judgment on the finished work.

=== From economic disputes to the blocking of the commission ===
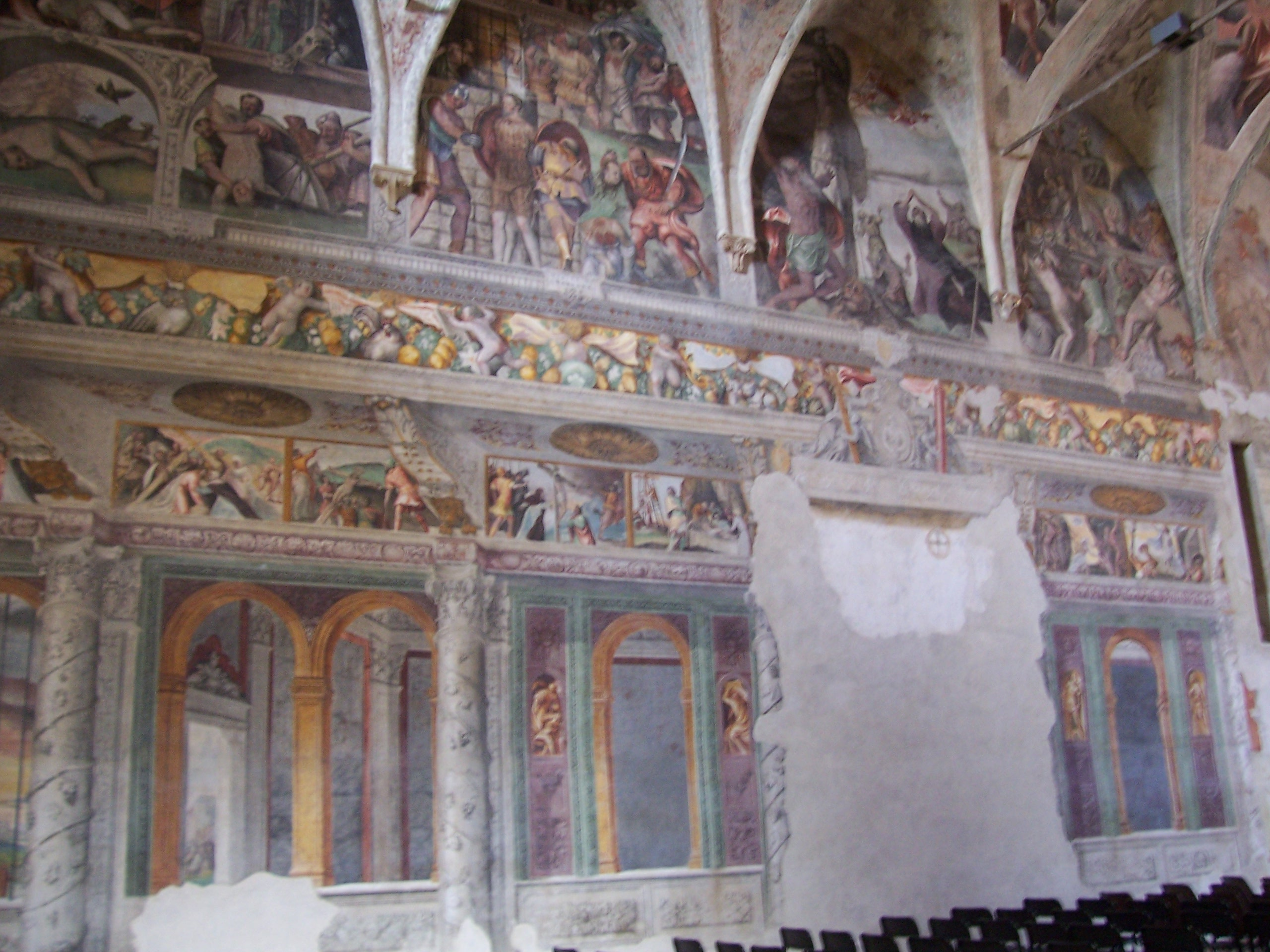
The west side of the nave of the Church of the Most Holy Body of Christ in Brescia. The marks of the mausoleum's original location, before relocation, can be seen.

The delivery deadline of 1506, however, was not met by the goldsmith. Two subsequent deeds dated to that year demonstrate the existence of an economic dispute between Delle Croci and the Martinengo commission, the causes of which had led to the degeneration of the relationship between the two and the blocking of the project. In the first document, dated May 13, 1506, Antonio II Martinengo claims to be indebted to the goldsmith for 300 ducats, of which 200 were for miscellaneous expenses related to the erecting of the mausoleum and a certain amount of silverware that the Martinengo family had received from Delle Croci without paying him, and 100 for money received on loan from the goldsmith. It is likely that the expenses related to the mausoleum concerned the procurement of the basic, admittedly expensive, materials, the expense of which had not yet been settled by the patron. To settle the dispute, Antonio II Martinengo turned the debt owed to the goldsmith over to a certain Gerolamo di Lazzaro, who owed the nobleman 300 ducats. The document attests that the arrangement was accepted and signed by all three parties involved.

However, the reconciliation was short lived. Six months later, in a deed dated November 6, 1506, Antonio II Martinengo again attests that he owes Delle Croci 1,000 lire, i.e. about 300 ducats, moreover for the same reason, i.e. various expenses related to the mausoleum and a pecuniary loan from the goldsmith to the nobleman. The document, moreover, confirms the death of Francesco Martinengo, brother of Antonio II and commissioner of the monument together with him. Again, all parties accept and sign the transfer of the debt to Bernardino delle Croci from Antonio II to a certain Ottolino di Sant'Ottolino, who owed the nobleman the same amount. Therefore, it becomes clear how Delle Croci's failure to deliver the mausoleum was actually caused by the non-payment of the Martinengo commission, which had not even covered the first expenses of purchasing materials, in addition to not repaying the goldsmith two loans he had obtained.

After this act, the documentary sequence is interrupted for a full 10 years. During this time, the European political climate became overheated, shortly leading to the events of the War of the League of Cambrai and the first French incursions into Brescia, culminating in the sack of Brescia in 1512 by the French, led by Gaston of Foix-Nemours. The latter, besides throwing the city into ruin, debunked the so-called myth of Brixia magnipotens. (Note: On the myth of Brixia magnipotens see Zani (2010, pp. 24–25) with relevant notes to the text, bibliography and documentation cited.) The Martinengo family, which had always been pro-Venetian, experienced difficult times, during which the commission to Delle Croci, concerning a golden age for the economy and the arts that had come to an end, was completely shelved.

=== The resumption of work ===
In 1516, the year of the reconquest of Brescia by Venice, the last document relating to this aforementioned commission is ultimately recorded. In the deed, dated August 6, 1516, one finds a now exhausted Antonio II Martinengo going so far as to cede to Delle Croci two masonry houses owned by him, worth 800 lire each but offered at the price of only 200, in exchange for the goldsmith's "solemn promise" to complete the work within a year and a half, thus by January 1518. In the event of non-compliance with the agreement, Delle Croci would incur penalties agreed upon by the same contract, relating to the rights to the two houses ceded. A detail of particular importance is the specification of how the mausoleum, although still being worked on, was already installed inside the church of the Most Holy Body of Christ ("inceptum in ecclesia Jesuatorum Brixie"); although the condition in which the mausoleum was at the time cannot be determined, it is certain that its completion still required a year and a half of work.

Of interest, in this regard, is what is reported in the will of Antonio II, drawn up the previous year (1515): in the act, the nobleman arranges to be buried inside the mausoleum, specifying that the body of his father Bernardino already rested inside it. The state of the mausoleum as of 1515, therefore, must not be too far from completion: Antonio II's statement suggests that the monument was finished at least in its main parts, such as the stone structure. The fact that Bernardino Martinengo's body had already found a place inside it, moreover, could be the reason for such a pressing need to complete it.

The Martinengo mausoleum became a permanent part of the Church of the Most Holy Body of Christ from at least the 1520s.

=== The burial of Marcantonio Martinengo ===
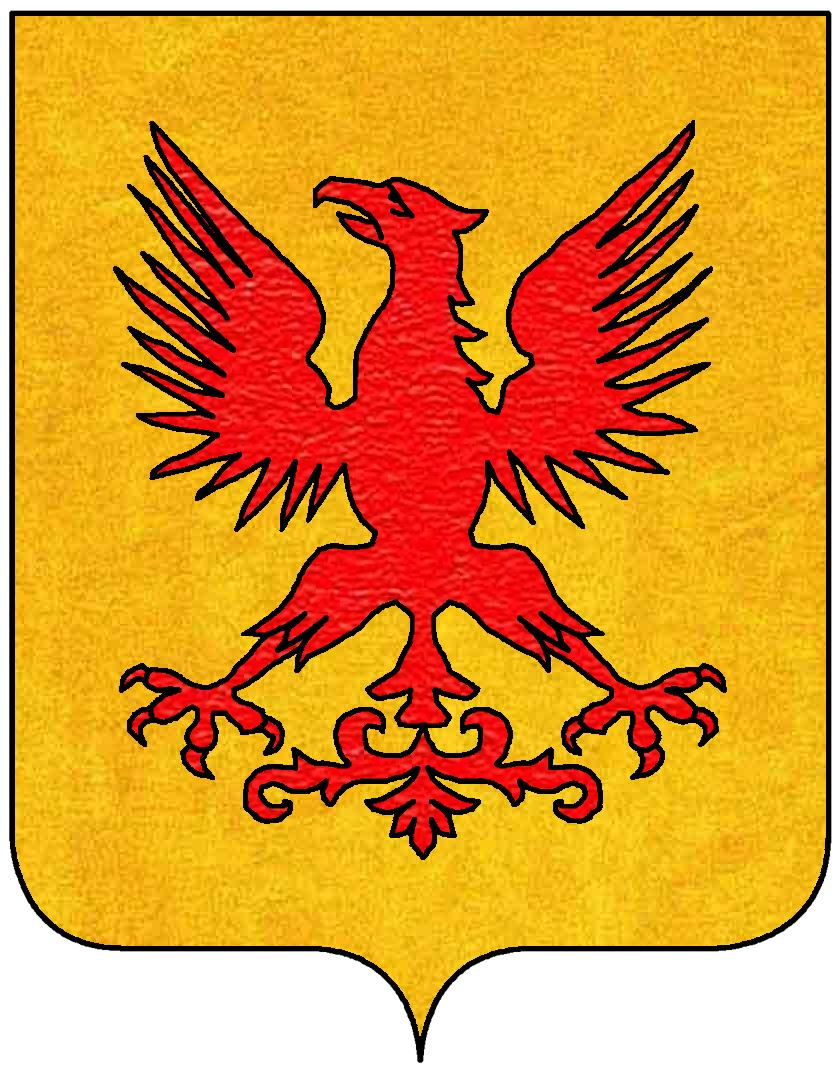
Coat of arms of the Martinengo family.

On July 24, 1526, about ten years after the conclusion of the previous documentary events, cavalry captain Marcantonio Martinengo della Pallata was severely wounded while fighting against the Spanish army around Cremona. The nobleman, a noted man-at-arms and great-grandson of Bartolomeo Colleoni, died four days later in Brescia, where he had been transported to be treated. Pandolfo Nassino, a Brescian historian of the time, relates the episode and describes the solemn funeral, celebrated by Mattia Ugoni, during which the captain was buried in the church of the Most Holy Body of Christ, inside the Martinengo family mausoleum in Padernello. This fact can be explained by noting how the two branches of the family were closely linked: that of the Martinengo della Pallata had been generated by breaking away from that of the Martinengo di Padernello through Gaspare Martinengo, son of Antonio I, founder of the church of the Most Holy Body of Christ, a place that therefore had significance for both families. It was also Gaspare who had brought the Martinengo della Pallata branch into the line of inheritance with Bartolomeo Colleoni, marrying a legitimate daughter, and later becoming the grandfather of Marcantonio Martinengo.

However, no evidence from the period or later testimonies attest to the affixing of any kind of tombstone or inscription at the captain's burial. A tombstone reported as such by Paolo Guerrini in 1930 is not to be considered as belonging to the mausoleum and to Marcantonio Martinengo, since it was later identified as a tombstone whose text was transcribed by Sebastiano Aragonese shortly after the mid-sixteenth century, who read on it the date "MDL" (1550), later abraded. Nevertheless, the Martinengo mausoleum became known as the mausoleum of Marcantonio Martinengo, just as the quality and composition of its ornaments were to suggest to future scholars, in relation to the importance of the captain.

Thus was born the great misunderstanding about the monument's origins, which would weigh on its history for nearly five hundred years. The testamentary will of Bernardino Martinengo, the commission and contract between Bernardino Delle Croci and the nobleman's sons, as well as the slow progress of the work were forgotten, but the mausoleum passed into history as the tomb of Captain Marcantonio Martinengo, built in 1526 to coincide with his death: with this attribution and chronological indication it would be remembered by all historical literature, whether Brescian or not.

=== The mausoleum in the 17th century ===
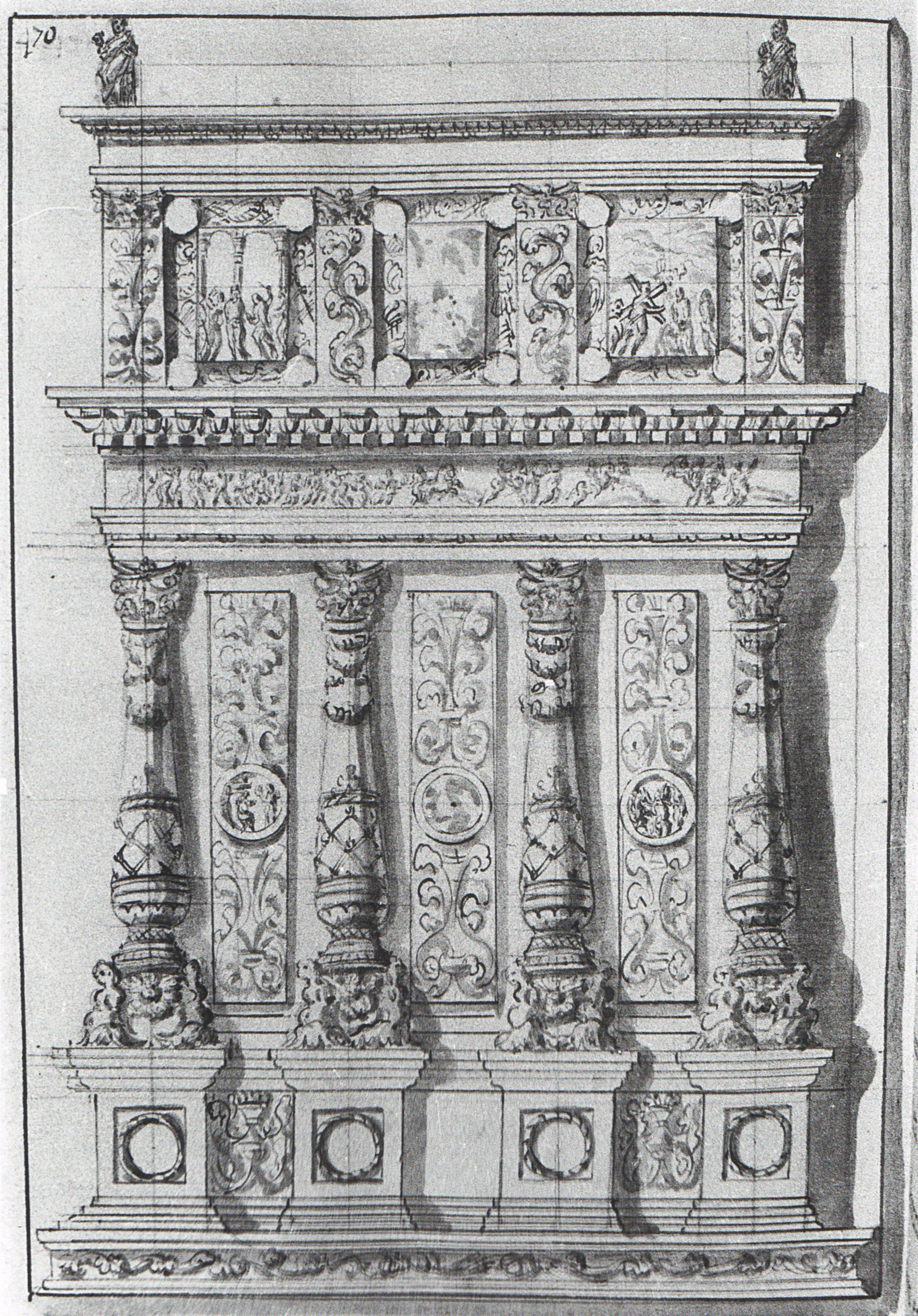
The 1668 watercolor depicting the mausoleum.

In 2003 a watercolor, preserved at the Queriniana Library in Brescia and dated 1668, depicting the mausoleum in frontal view was made known. The drawing comes from the second volume of the Trophaea Martia, manuscripted and decorated in Venice between 1686 and 1689 in celebration of the Martinengo da Barco family. This is a very valuable document because it restores the condition of the monument at that date, providing useful data to interpret some of the events related to the commission of the work and its evolution. Although it is quite sketchy, it illustrates how, at that date, the central bronze panel was already missing and not yet filled by the wooden Crucifixion present today, and known only from an engraving of 1822. The crowning is already identical to the present one, without any central fastigium, while the two corner statues are evidently the same ones still present.

The frieze with the Triumphs, on the other hand, is drawn intact, although only the parts that remain are fairly faithfully reproduced, while the currently missing features are much more approximate and almost incomplete, as if the monument lacked them even then and the author of the watercolor freely interpreted them for completeness of design. All other parts of the mausoleum faithfully correspond to the existing one. In particular, the central clipeus on the back covering of the monument already appears to be empty, but it is not known whether it was intended that way or was to accommodate something else, for example, another marble or bronze tondo, or an inscription or coat of arms.

=== The transfer to the Civic Museums ===
The monastery attached to the church, which over the centuries saw first the fall of the Jesuati, then the entry and demise of the Canons Regular of San Giorgio in Alga, and finally the management of the reformed Franciscan friars, remained active until 1810 when, following the Napoleonic suppressions, the Franciscan order was abolished and the monastery seized, turning into state property. The church, however, was not secularized, enjoying the presence of two priests appointed by the bishop= Most of the artistic heritage inside, including the Martinengo mausoleum, was thus saved from possible expropriation and dispersion. In 1883, however, the same Martinengo mausoleum was dismantled and transferred to the newly founded Brescia Civic Museums to enrich its exhibition holdings. Thus wrote Antonio Fappani in 1972:

It was desired to decorate the new museum with the Martinengo monument of San Cristo, and, with the consent of the Monsignor Bishop and the Martinengo counts, the graceful mausoleum was removed from its original site and taken to Santa Giulia where indeed it makes a splendid figure. To compensate then San Cristo for the loss of such a treasure of art, the municipality contributed to the restoration of that church.

— Antonio Fappani, Mons. Pietro Capretti, 1972, p. 28

The mausoleum was immediately installed in the choir of the nuns of the Santa Giulia monastery, where the museum was located along with the former church of Santa Giulia, under the central side arch of the north wall. In this location it is documented by all the photographs of the time, surrounded by other pieces, objects and monuments that were musealized and that would form the nucleus of exhibits for the Santa Giulia museum, which opened in 1998. When the museum was being set up, the work was moved against the west end of the choir, at the gap, now walled up, toward the former church of Santa Giulia.

== Description ==
The mausoleum has simple, defined lines, adorned with a profusion of ornamental details, characteristic of Brescian Renaissance sculpture. On a multi-tiered base rise four columns on pedestals, both covered with elaborate decorations and composed of different marbles. The pedestals, in particular, feature bronze roundels with various subjects depicted, many of which have disappeared. The columns are mirrored at the bottom through the use of lesenes, and in the three spaces between them are equally elaborate panels with three roundels in the center, two of which are made of marble and depict mythological scenes: these are a Scene of Sacrifice and a Scene of Battle. Other bronze roundels, sixteen in all but many of them lost, are located on the pedestals of the columns and pilasters and depict other scenes from mythology.

The columns then support an entablature whose frieze, which has survived in fragmentary manner, is decorated by the Triumphs of Faith, Fortitude, and Justice, depicted in the form of a long procession. Above the entablature stands the sarcophagus, decorated with three square bronze tiles depicting the Flagellation of Christ, the Ascent to Calvary and Prayer in the Garden. Two other panels, one on the right side and one central to the chest, completed the cycle, but both are missing: one, the central Deposition, is replaced with a copy carved in wood, while the subject of the second, which was likely to be a Crucifixion, is unknown.

The panels are framed by frames laden with symbols related to Christian iconography and the common world, while crowning the mausoleum are the two statues of St. Peter and St. Paul, in angular positions. Finally, on the lower face of the sarcophagus is inlaid in relief a large black marble eagle, the symbol of the Martinengo family.

== Style ==
=== Critical itinerary ===
The monument first became the subject of critical study in 1900 by Alfred Gotthold Meyer, in the second volume of his Oberitalienische Frührenaissance: the text devotes an entire chapter to Brescian sculpture and architecture, identifying them for the first time as a specific critical case to be dealt with separately from the broader Lombard context, with a detailed analysis of the works and bibliography, including local ones. Meyer, like everyone else, considers the mausoleum executed for Marcantonio Martinengo and even postdates it to around 1530, saying that he deduces this information from Federico Odorici's writings; he also brings it closer to Stefano Lamberti, to whom he attributes the marble ornamentation, judging it to be correctly more modern than that of the facade of the church of Santa Maria dei Miracoli. On the other hand, the scholar identifies the same author of the Caesars of the Palazzo della Loggia, thus Gasparo Cairano, as the sculptor of the two marble tondi with a mythological subject, conjecturing his responsibility for the bronze tondi as well.

The Martinengo mausoleum was no longer the subject of significant critical study until the 1930s, when Antonio Morassi placed it at the basis of a new critical reconstruction referring to Maffeo Olivieri, generating a major new misunderstanding in the historiography of Brescian Renaissance sculpture. Knowledge about Olivieri at the beginning of the 20th century, before the unprecedented transformation of this sculptor into the undisputed protagonist of Brescian Renaissance sculpture, is very limited and related only to the production of a few medals, a wooden altarpiece in Condino, and the two signed bronze candelabra in St. Mark's Basilica in Venice. (Note: See the section "The great twentieth-century misunderstanding: Maffeo Olivieri" in "Gasparo Cairano's Critical Itinerary" for further discussion. See also Zani (2010, pp. 79–85).) The eventual potential of this evidently multifaceted artist, who was nevertheless completely absent from the sources of the time, is precisely first captured by Antonio Morassi in a 1936 article. The scholar, convinced that he was in the presence of a decidedly important and undiscovered author, went to Brescia in search of important works that a figure of this type must surely have left behind.

So I went around the churches of Brescia, where he had kept his workshop and from whence he perhaps never for a long time moved, always in search of my author; and I was already despairing, proving fruitless even some archival investigation, of tracing his footsteps, when it happened to me to find myself at the Christian Museum, in the deconsecrated church of Santa Giulia. [...] I stopped my attention on that distinguished masterpiece of Brescian sculpture that is the mausoleum of General Marc'Antonio Martinengo. I observed [...] the strange flavor of that style in which Gothic substrata, mixed with Baroque precursors, emerge, which is proper to the decorative art of Brescia in the sixteenth century. And I was thinking about the architectural relations of the monument with the portal of Santa Maria dei Miracoli, catching in it some leading threads that well clarify its northern origins, when, as I approached to examine the bronze medallions embedded in the plinths, I had the sensation that I was facing creations of the master I was researching. The resemblance, indeed, the partial identity, of these figures with those seated in the niches of the Venetian candelabra, which had well remained in my eyes, gave me the confidence that I had come, at last, to a safe harbor. [...] Probably the bronze square panels of the sarcophagus, as well as the triumphal frieze in which the stylistic affinity to Condino's figures was evident, must also have belonged to him. I was left with some uncertainty, however, about the possible assignment of the marble part to Maffeo.

— Antonio Morassi, Per la ricostruzione di Maffeo Olivieri in "Bollettino d'Arte", 6 December 1936, pp. 243–245

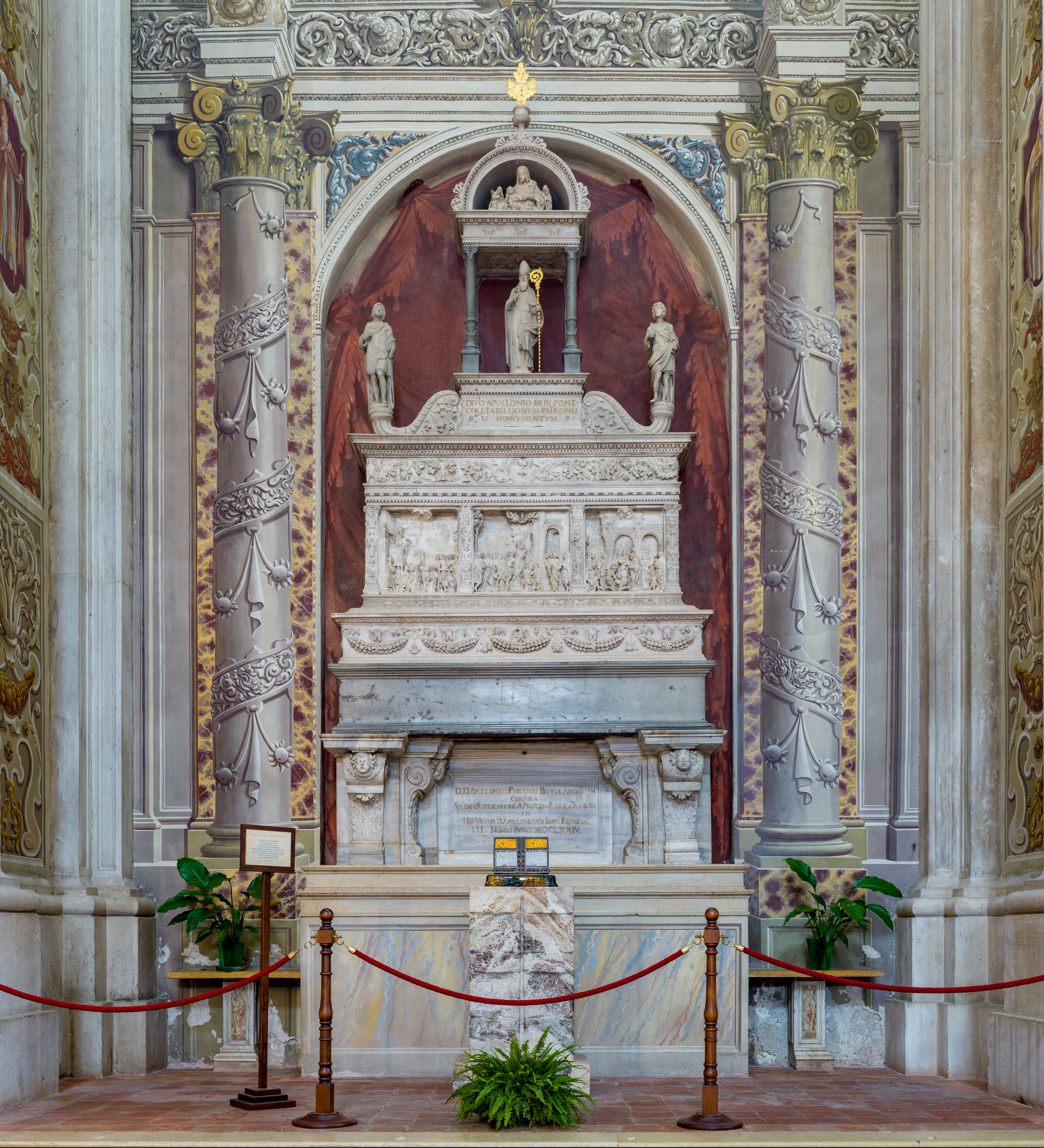
The ark of Sant'Apollonio.

At this point in the article, Morassi is already convinced of Olivieri's authorship of the Martinengo mausoleum bronzes, while he still has doubts about the marble part. These doubts would be cleared later, in the same article, by purely deductive means. Morassi is also affected by the misunderstanding of the monument's dating, which goes to the scholar's aid in comparing it with the Venetian candelabra dated 1527. Moreover, Morassi also misunderstands Stefano Fenaroli's proposal to assign the mausoleum's bronzes to Olivieri, claiming that the Brescian scholar must have deduced their names from documents of the time, when this was manifestly not possible since, in that case, Fenaroli would not have hesitated to include them in the documentary appendix of his Dictionary. After further deductive reasoning, which leads Morassi to even question the existence of masters of reference in the field of sculpture in early sixteenth-century Brescia, the scholar no longer has any doubt in assigning Maffeo also the responsibility for the mausoleum's stone apparatus:

But if Olivieri's architectural-decorative sense (also in the Venetian candelabra, as well as in the Martinengo mausoleum) is of a pure Lombard orientation, the same cannot be said of the figural parts. The broad, soft, animated treatment of his figures, often modeled with synthesis and abbreviations, presupposes the abandonment of the naturalistic current headed by Amadeo and Briosco. with its dry, sharp, sour character, which was exaggerated by certain followers such as the Mantegazza.

— Antonio Morassi, Per la ricostruzione di Maffeo Olivieri in "Bollettino d'Arte", 6 December 1936, pp.246-247

In the 1939 volume devoted to Brescia of the Catalogue of Things of Art and Antiquity in Italy, Antonio Morassi no longer has any doubt in attributing to Olivieri the qualification of sculptor and, therefore, proceeds to define his catalog of Brescian works in marble, of much greater quantitative and qualitative proportions than the medals and the wooden altarpiece assigned up to that time. The Martinengo mausoleum becomes a "most important work, certainly by Maffeo Olivieri." The ark of Sant'Apollonio is classified as "perhaps the youthful work of Maffeo Olivieri, as would be judged from the style, comparing the ark with Martinengo's funerary monument." By similarities with the mausoleum, the altar of San Girolamo in San Francesco also becomes "probably the work of Maffeo Olivieri." All works not in keeping with the style of the new sculpture master are simply hinted at as anonymous if not belittled or panned, committing various errors of evaluation and often going so far as to neglect even contemporary sources that specifically indicated their quality and authors. (Note: Thus interpreted are the Apostles of the Sanctuary of the Miracles by Gasparo Cairano and Tamagnino (Morassi (1939, pp. 411, 414)), the Tomb of Gaspare Brunelli (Morassi (1939, p. 256)), the Caprioli Adoration (Morassi (1939, p. 246)) and the ark of San Tiziano (Morassi (1939, p. 135)). See Zani (2010, p. 82) for other details.) On the other hand, he considers the "upper fastigium" of the Martinengo mausoleum to have disappeared, taking it for granted in the composition and in fact also stipulated in the 1503 contract.

From Antonio Morassi's reconstruction, the complex panorama of currents and artists of Brescian Renaissance sculpture turns out to be downplayed and not addressed with due accuracy, as well as hinged around a bronze and wood carver relabeled as master of marble, with a catalog of works based solely on the attribution of the Martinengo mausoleum, and on nothing else. The consequences of Morassi's erroneous reinterpretation are very heavy and take the form of a series of repercussions in the critical sphere. The first to fall into the misunderstanding is Gaetano Panazza who, in the 1958 catalog of the Brescia Civic Museums, finds the attribution of the Martinengo mausoleum to Olivieri "correct". The same Panazza, moreover, considers the upper crowning of the mausoleum to be missing, also following Morassi's hypothesis in this sense. The scholar also analyzes the central panel of the chest, depicting the Deposition of Christ on a wooden panel painted in imitation bronze, believing it to be from the late 16th century. On the basis of the found watercolor of 1688, which does not yet depict it, Panazza's proposed dating could not be accepted and therefore would be postponed. Even in the seminal History of Brescia, published by Treccani in 1963, the opportunity to definitively bring order to the historiography of the period is partially lost when Adriano Peroni maintains Maffeo Olivieri's catalog and artistic role unchanged, based on Morassi's "well-founded critical reconstruction," which, moreover, is seen as a natural response to the gap concerning the artist's youthful years.

This preeminent position assumed by Maffeo Olivieri finally lapses in 1977, when Camillo Boselli, in the Regesto artistico dei notai roganti in Brescia dall'anno 1500 all'anno 1560, the result of research in the then unfathomable notarial fund of the State Archives of Brescia, partially reconstructs the Cairano family tree and publishes the series of fundamental documents, presented in the chapter on the history of the monument; they reconstruct the Martinengo mausoleum commission, starting from the 1503 contract between Bernardino delle Croci and the brothers Francesco and Antonio II Martinengo of Padernello, to the two acts of economic disputes, to the last contract of 1516. It is Boselli himself who first noticed the very heavy significance of his findings, writing at the end of the transcription of the original 1503 contract:

Document of extreme importance for the history of Brescian sculpture of the first half of the 16th century. In fact, it invalidates the attribution to Maffeo Olivieri of the Martinengo Monument, now in the Christian Museum, already proposed by Fenaroli, critically taken up by Morassi, accepted by Peroni and Panazza. Thus also its most current chronology (1526) is denied, lowering the date of design to 1503, and this goes back to the advantage of the homogeneity of Brescian sculpture in that it stands next to the tomb of S. Apollonio in the Duomo Nuovo (1504-1510) and that of S. Tiziano in S. Cosma (1503) [...]. The problem is that of attribution, since Bernardino Dalle Croci is always referred to in all monuments as aurifex and never as sculptor, which if it can be accepted for parts of metal frieze cannot justify the decorative part in marble. The attribution of this monument is a fundamental problem, for if it is to be taken away from Olivieri it falls apart the truly logical construction that the most recent criticism had built on Olivieri.

— Camillo Boselli, Regesto artistico dei notai roganti in Brescia dall'anno 1500 all'anno 1560, 1977, p. 35 (documents)

The fabrication of the monument is thus backdated by almost twenty years, and the attribution to Maffeo Olivieri of this and all other works assigned to him by Morassi, which on the authorship of the mausoleum were based, collapses. In contrast, in the second half of the 20th century, a number of documents emerged from civil and ecclesiastical archives confirming Maffeo Olivieri's activity as a wood carver, along with a number of works confidently attributed to him. Without being aware of the documentation found by Camillo Boselli, the scholar Francesco Rossi published, in the same 1977, an in-depth study on the activity of Maffeo Olivieri as a bronze carver, concluding with a clear denial, stylistically, to any affinity between Maffeo and the Martinengo mausoleum, including even the metal reliefs:

Olivieri's authorship of the Martinengo Mausoleum seems to me, therefore, at least hypothetical, not justified by what we really know about his stylistic evolution. It therefore seems to me appropriate, as a line of hypothesis, to speak of a still anonymous Master of the Martinengo Mausoleum.

— Francesco Rossi, Maffeo Olivieri and Brescian bronzes of the 1500s in "Lombard Art", 47/48, 1977, pp. 115–134

=== The unknown author of the Martinengo mausoleum ===
Having completely fallen apart, in 1977, Maffeo Olivieri's authorship of the mausoleum, the monument was again linked to an anonymous Brescian master for at least two decades, and with it the other works attributed to him. Camillo Boselli was also the first to point out how the discovery of the contracts with Bernardino delle Croci, a goldsmith who was never a sculptor in his career, as well as his sons, does not solve the problem of attribution, since Delle Croci likely did not have the skills to make the stone part. All the marble parts of the monument were finally assigned to Gasparo Cairano by Vito Zani in two subsequent studies in 2001 and 2003, as part of a profound organic reconsideration of Brescian Renaissance sculpture, an attribution reaffirmed in the first monograph on the greatest exponent of Brescian sculpture of the period, also published by Zani in 2010, and rapidly accepted by art critics in the following years. (Note: In particular, the scholar's proposal was taken up by Valerio Terraroli, who entrusted Vito Zani with the editing of the chapter on Brescian Renaissance sculpture in the large monograph devoted to Lombard sculpture between the 15th and 20th centuries published in 2011. Cf. Zani (2011, pp. 37–99))

Vito Zani, equally assuming that Delle Croci could not also have been the sculptor of the work, necessarily links the stone parts, and perhaps even the entire project, to a specialized workshop capable of working on works of this qualitative and cultural degree. It therefore becomes natural to assume that, at the time of the 1503 contract between the Martinengo brothers and the goldsmith, the latter subcontracted the stone part to a sculptor's workshop, which was, moreover, extremely common at the time. By 1503, in Brescia, Zani identifies only two workshops capable of works of this level: that of Sanmicheli and that of Cairano. The former, however, left the city long before the work was completed, perhaps even as early as around 1503-1504. Therefore, Cairano's workshop was the only one left in the city, after the Sanmicheli's departure already in the first decade of the century, capable of successfully working on such a complex. The attribution to Gasparo Cairano, moreover, draws strength from the critical stylistic analysis of the two crowning statues of the monument, depicting St. Peter and St. Paul. They show a palpable affinity with the models used by Cairano for the same subjects on the portal of the cathedral of Salò, documented from 1506-1508, and for those of the Apostles for the church of San Pietro in Oliveto, executed by 1507. The two statues, in particular, reveal the adoption of a still primordial manner, referable to the sculptor's now extreme artistic maturity, which is most evident in the two marble roundels below, already attributed to Cairano by Meyer in 1900. (Note: Also noteworthy is a contract, dated June 11, 1520 and made between Stefano Lamberti and Bernardino Delle Croci (Brescia Historical Archives, Religion Fund, 109, c. 119), in which a son of Gasparo Cairano, named Giovanni Antonio, qualified as a goldsmith, appears as a witness. This document, though not probative, is further evidence of the existence of some professional relationship between the goldsmith and the sculptor's family. Cf. Zani (2010, p. 138.))

However, an early involvement of the Sanmicheli at least in the design of the mausoleum is not excluded. This is likely in light of the monument's pronounced decorative component, which at least in this respect deviates from Gasparo Cairano's style. It is therefore probable that the Sanmicheli workshop, struggling to work in a Brescia whose style had rapidly changed from the fine ornamentation of the sanctuary of the Miracles to the powerful and posed classicism of the Loggia, led by the now highly regarded Gasparo Cairano, attempted to make up for it by obtaining the commission for the ark of San Tiziano and, perhaps, participating in the initial stages of the Martinengo commission. The rapid abandonment of Brescia by the Sanmicheli, who no longer had a way of putting the family specialization into practice, led at that point to Gasparo Cairano's involvement, even at a somewhat later stage of the work.

It is worth noting, (Note: This is a complex historical-critical discourse woven on what is attested by the documents that have come down to us and, in fact, still open to various critical voices. In addition to Zani (2010, pp. 109, 135–138) see the relevant considerations presented in Vito Zani (3 September 2012). "Un marmo lombardo del Rinascimento e qualche precisazione sulla scultura lapidea a Brescia tra Quattro e Cinquecento (seconda parte), articolo su www.antiqua.mi.it". Archived from the original on 10 January 2014. and Vito Zani (1 November 2012). "Un marmo lombardo del Rinascimento e qualche precisazione sulla scultura lapidea a Brescia tra Quattro e Cinquecento (terza e ultima parte), articolo su www.antiqua.mi.it". Archived from the original on 10 January 2014. with relevant notes to the text and bibliography cited.) however, that Delle Croci's final contract is dated 1516, but Gasparo is reported to have died as early as 1517, as Vito Zani again demonstrates: therefore, if one entrusts Cairano with the stone work, the documents dictate that he would not have had the material time to execute it completely in this short period and, consequently, at least much of it must be placed before this date, assuming Gasparo's involvement in the commission. In all likelihood, however, Gasparo would not have a chance to see the work completed, the execution of which may have been taken over by his workshop and, in particular, his son Simone. The last contract of 1516, as already pointed out, informs, however, that the still incomplete work was already installed in the church, but it is not known in what condition, and that it had already housed the remains of Bernardino Martinengo since the previous year: this presupposes a not insignificant state of progress of the work, factually complete at least in the structure and main architectural components. The incompleteness reported by the 1516 contract, therefore, could be limited to decorative inserts of various kinds, including the bronze parts certainly due to Delle Croci. In this regard, therefore, it is not improper to assume that the missing bronze panels, i.e., the two on the case, one of which was replaced by a wooden panel, and those on the frieze, which were already missing in the 1688 drawing, might even never have been executed, and thus leave one to believe that Bernardino delle Croci never fulfilled the agreement with Antonio II Martinengo, not even the last contract of 1516.

=== Compositional features ===
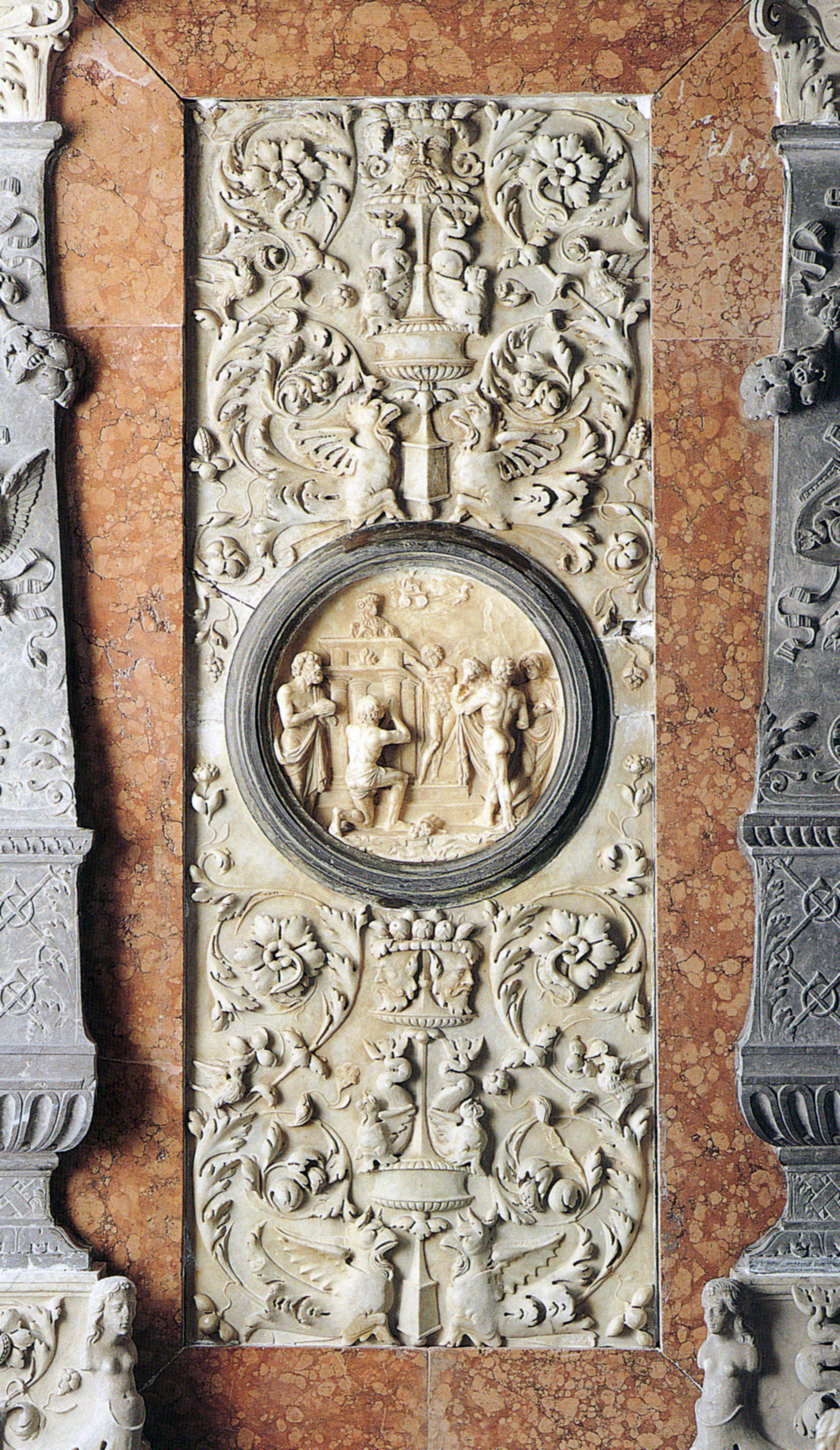
The panel with the Scene of Sacrifice.

The Martinengo mausoleum stands out as one of the greatest masterpieces of the Brescian Renaissance in the field of sculpture, in which all the main elements characteristic of the new art, new interests and new trends of the time from central Italy converge: architectural and artistic purity, refinement of chromatics, recourse to ancient marbles, many of them probably salvaged, mythological iconography and high celebration of the deceased for whom the monument is intended.

The work has a remarkably celebratory character, enhanced in particular by the sought-after chromatic effect and the use of different types of stones and marbles, some of which are also refined and ancient. On the Botticino marble plinth rest the four columns with their shafts in gray stone from Trentino, like the pedestals and shafts of the mirrored lesenes, which contrasts with the white of the capitals, bases, and background panels. Further contrast is then sought with the use of red Verona marble, and the same contrasts are detected in the upper sarcophagus, but reversed: instead of the white-gray-white sequence below, here there is gray-white-gray, plus a long lath of red marble as the frieze of the crowning entablature. Completing the color variety are numerous porphyry discs and colored stones, probably taken from ruined Roman monuments, particularly at the corners of the sarcophagus tiles and on the plinth, where there is a large central black clipeus.

The numerous bronze reliefs increase the preciousness and value of the monument and can be grouped into two sets: one with a mythological character and one with a religious character. The mythological reliefs decorate the base of the monument and the backdrop behind the columns: here, in particular, the Scene of Sacrifice and the Scene of Battle present a certain workmanship, resolving the two complex and articulated scenes in the order of a few centimeters with a very high level of detail. However, it is not possible to find the overall sense of the iconographic scheme carried out by the antique reliefs, mainly due to the loss of numerous roundels that adorned the pedestals of the columns.

The Christian subjects are gathered along the sarcophagus, divided between the Stories of the Passion and the Triumphs of the Virtues in the frieze below, both of which are incomplete. The Triumphs are suitable for celebrating the moral and civic qualities of the deceased, while the Stories of the Passion are pertinent to the monument's funerary purpose.

=== References and stylistic considerations ===
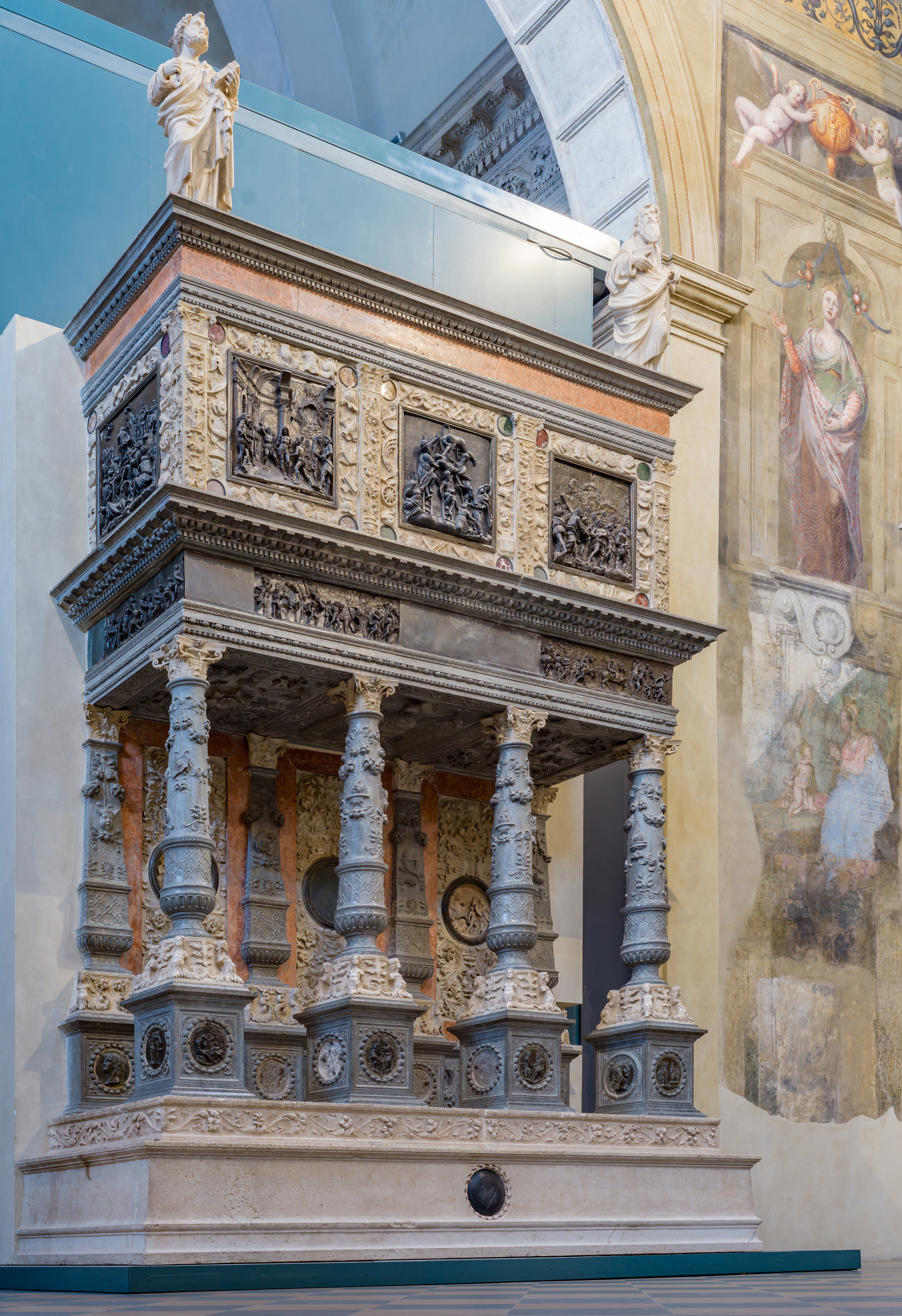
The Martinengo Mausoleum in the nuns' choir.

The Martinengo mausoleum shows stylistic affinity, admittedly quite generic, with at least two Milanese sepulchres, both referring to the Cazzaniga-Briosco workshop and dated to the 1480s: the tomb of Giacomo Stefano Brivio in the basilica of Sant'Eustorgio and that of Francesco Della Torre in the church of Santa Maria delle Grazie.

A closer correlation, both in structure and in the presence of historiated bronze panels on the front of the funeral monument, is found instead with the tomb of Gerolamo and Marcantonio Della Torre in the church of San Fermo Maggiore in Verona, attributed to Andrea Briosco. In 2008, as part of an exhibition dedicated to him, the attribution of the work was revised to refer only the bronze panels, now in the Louvre Museum, to Briosco, while the stone apparatus was assigned to Vincenzo Grandi. The two sepulchres are evidently very similar, so much so that the chronological problem of the precedence of one over the other has been raised, since the dating of the Veronese monument is also very doubtful, even if one were to assert the hypothesis put forward in 2008 of a terminus post quem at 1511, since this does not resolve the issue. A plausible alternative is also the mutual influence, in execution, between the two works.

The decoration of the background panelling, with a marked plastic connotation, mainly resumes the one experimented again by Gasparo Cairano in the frieze of the portal of the Loggia staircase, datable to about 1508. The panels themselves, in any case, recall the quadrangular panels by Pietro Lombardo and his sons on the bases of the holy arch of the church of Santa Maria dei Miracoli in Venice. Also noteworthy are the bands, decorated with a continuous frieze of weapons and military trophies, that frame Delle Croci's bronze panels, whose artistic reference has been identified by Agosti in the so-called Trophies of Santa Sabina in the Uffizi in Florence. In 2010, however, Vito Zani also points out their derivation from the same motifs on the friezes on the arch of the Sergii in Pula. The same friezes, in any case, are also found in the ground-floor rooms of the Palazzo della Loggia.

As for the bronze apparatus, the work of Bernardino delle Croci, it is equally permeated by the search for an "all'antica" language, akin to the classicist orientation assumed by Paduan bronze production at the beginning of the 16th century. In some of the bronze roundels on the pedestals of the columns, however, there are references from ancient coins or modern medals created on the example of the previous ones. It is again Giovanni Agosti who proposes a woodcut with the Triumph of Christ, taken from drawings by Titian, as a possible reference for the Triumphs of Virtues on the Martinengo mausoleum; however, this attribution is not shared by Vito Zani, who, in 2010, proposes rather a comparison with two reliefs preserved at the Ca' d'Oro by Vittore Gambello, dated to after 1506 because of a reference to the Laocoon, which in turn came from a funerary monument.

==== The two figured tondi ====
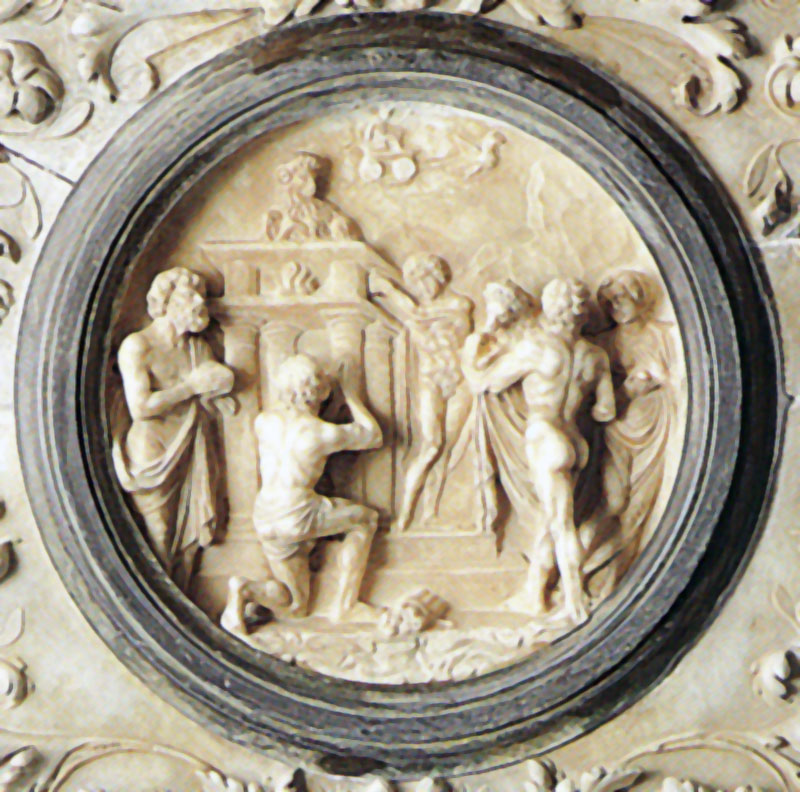
Scene of sacrifice.

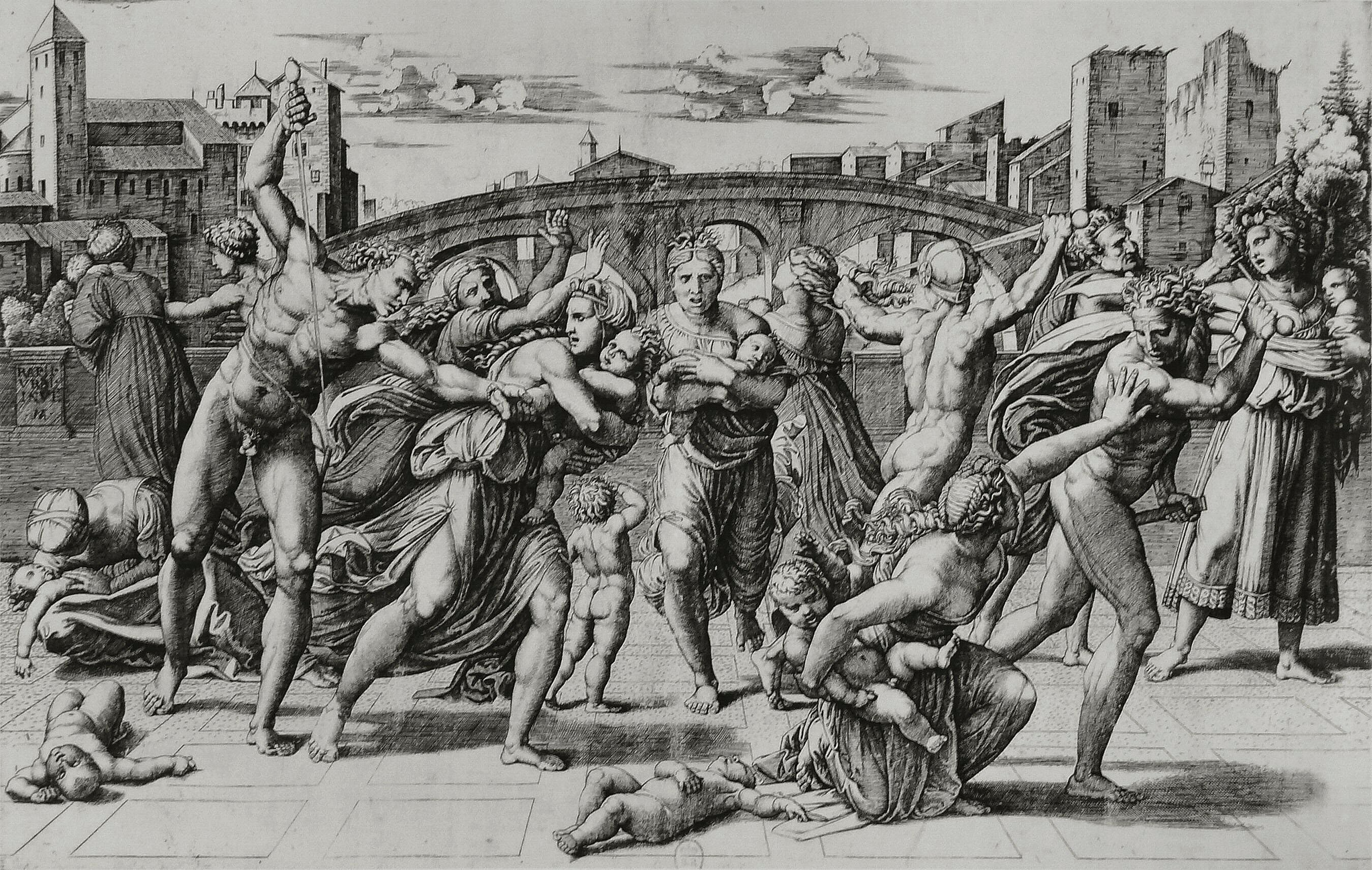
Marcantonio Raimondi, Massacre of the Innocents.

The background panelling of the mausoleum, except the central one, have set two marble tondi depicting a Scene of Sacrifice in the one on the left and a Battle Scene in the one on the right. These two works are perhaps the most valuable in the monument in terms of technical, qualitative and cultural level. Attributed to the chisel of Gasparo Cairano, they lend themselves to a number of stylistic considerations, which are also useful in better framing the tomb from the point of view of chronology and the cultural milieu in which it was made, as well as in strengthening the attribution to Gasparo Cairano and confirming his remarkable skills in the original reworking of classical and contemporary models.

The Scene of Sacrifice depicts a fairly rare theme, at that time widespread only in bronzes and according to different modes of representation, as can be deduced from the specimens collected by Fritz Saxl in a 1939 essay, among which those by Andrea Briosco for the Easter candle in the basilica of St. Anthony in Padua and for the already mentioned Della Torre funeral monument in San Fermo Maggiore in Verona stand out in particular. The composition of these Sacrifices is profoundly different, yet it is remarkable how the same subject is also found on the Della Torre tomb, which has already been previously related to the Martinengo mausoleum by chronology and stylistic affinity. Even on the facade of the church of Santa Maria dei Miracoli in Brescia, however, one finds formulations of the subject, again very distant from the exemplar on the mausoleum and depicted in the sacrificial altar. A self-celebrating Venetian medal by goldsmith Vittore Gambello, signed and dated 1508, depicting a pagan Sacrifice, appears much more similar. According to Vito Zani, in a 2013 article, this medal may have served as a model for the Brescia tondo, also because of the circular solution of the subject, but in a different variation. The pagan Sacrifice, in this case, is reformulated in the Christian sense, according to the most illustrious reference for the time, namely Michelangelo's Sacrifice of Noah, frescoed between 1508 and 1510 in the Sistine Chapel. (Note: In the Brescian tondo, overall, the same elements as in the Roman scene recur, particularly the old man at the altar on which the sacrifice is being made and the three naked young men around him. Estranged from biblical iconography, however, is the female figure on the far right, bare-breasted, holding a fruit and facing the young man who is carrying the lamb to the altar, unidentified with Noah's wife, and perhaps more aligned with the theme of original sin. The mausoleum, in any case, was commissioned in deference to the testamentary provisions of Bernardino Martinengo di Padernello by his sons, so some moralizing or family-related intention is not ruled out. Also foreign to the traditional iconographic subject of Noah's Sacrifice is the chariot in the sky in the background, although Genesis tells of the appearance of the figure of the Eternal Father in the clouds in thanksgiving for the rite. Cf. Vito Zani (1 March 2013). "Una copia del Sacrificio del Mausoleo Martinengo e alcune note iconografiche e stilistiche, articolo su www.antiqua.mi.it". Archived from the original on 14 July 2014.)

Considering these elements, one can conclude how this Scene of Sacrifice is really the result of an original elaboration of the iconographic theme, i.e., devoid of specific references, apart from some suggestions from similar works of the time, making the marble tondo a specimen of remarkable merit for its mastery of the ancient style, the most successful outcome of a Classical culture inaugurated in Brescia twenty years earlier with the worksites of the Sanctuary of the Miracles and the Loggia. Numerous references, more or less contemporary, are identifiable, revealing how a true reinterpretation of them was implemented, going so far as to distort them from their original context in order to adapt them to the new composition. Francesco Rossi, in 1977, identifies in the nude from behind on the right of the Scene of Sacrifice a reprise of an early 16th-century Paduan plaque depicting Orpheus in Hell, while Vito Zani, in 2013, correlates the raised altar in the Martinengo mausoleum tondo to the small temple in the background of a bronze plaque depicting Hercules and Cacus, preserved at the National Gallery of Art in Washington and attributed to Caradosso.

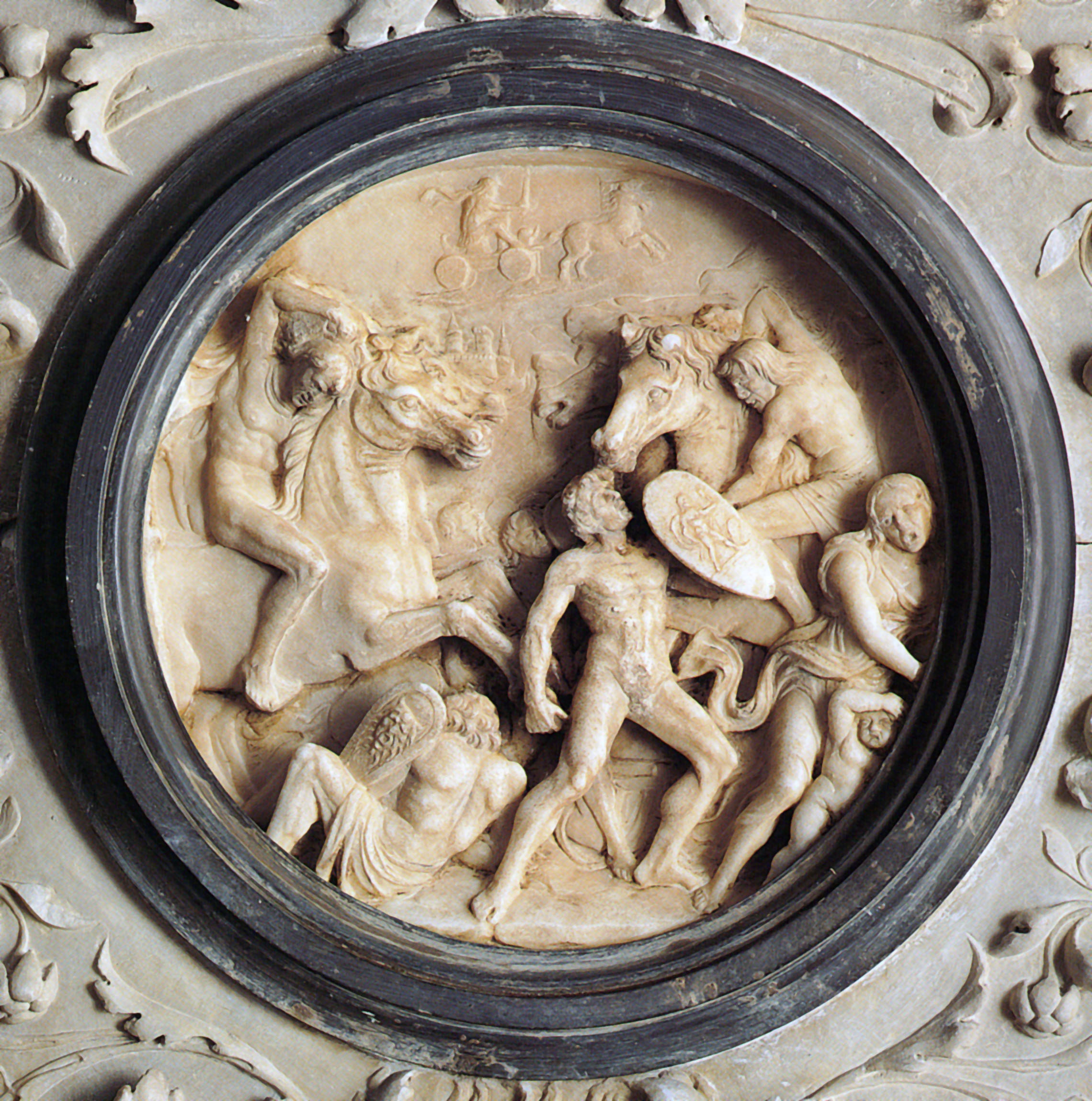
Battle scene.

Even in the specular tondo, depicting the Battle Scene, there is the same criterion of reworking different iconographic subjects, with an original, homogeneous and effective rendering. Giovanni Agosti, in 1993, is the first to identify Marcantonio Raimondi's engraving with the Massacre of the Innocents borrowed from Raphael Sanzio as one of the references for this scene, which, however, Gasparo Cairano quotes very freely: the woman on the far right, tangent to the perimeter of the tondo, is extrapolated from two different figures, the two women central to the composition, one for the body and the other for the face, while the child is a 180° rotation of Raimondi's similar figure in the center of the scene.

In contrast, the group on the left, depicting a soldier on horseback impaling the defeated enemy on the ground, takes up a very frequent subject in the monumental art and numismatics of imperial Rome. This particular composition, repeatedly reproduced by Lombard sculptors of the Renaissance period, is first found among the basement decorations of the facade of the Certosa di Pavia and later also in a Brescian example not coincidentally attributable to Gasparo Cairano, namely on one of the friezes of the pillars of the portico of the Loggia, where, moreover, the soldier standing in front of the horse is also depicted. This same soldier figure is in turn present on the base of a pilaster of the Caprioli Adoration, another work attributable to Gasparo Cairano. This soldier follows, as does the equestrian group, a subject long reiterated in imperial Rome, beginning with the figures in the Fontana dei Dioscuri in Piazza del Quirinale in Rome but later repeated in many combat scenes, particularly those on sarcophagi. However, the author of the tondo demonstrates, even in this case, an almost contemptuous mastery of interpretation, freely rotating forms and subjects to fit the context, exactly as with the figures in the Massacre of the Innocents: the soldier has his back turned in the Loggia frieze, rotated to the front and facing left in the Caprioli Adoration, and finally facing front but turned right in the tondo on the Martinengo mausoleum.

Therefore, according to the references adopted for the execution of the two tondi, they are likely to be dated to a little after 1510, although the Battle Scene remains closer to the style expressed during the great Brescian public building sites, which had closed a few years before. More in line with this dating is the Scene of Sacrifice, which reveals a greater sensitivity to the examples of bronzes, a sphere where, at this point, Gasparo Cairano seems to find most of the subjects to be subjected to his reworkings, while for the two apex statues of St. Peter and St. Paul he remains faithful to the traditional models he matured. This fact, which may initially come as a surprise, actually finds a sensible correspondence in the context in which the Martinengo mausoleum was designed and built: that is, a monument, which for the Brescian context was then unheard of, with a set of bronzes executed under the superintendence of the goldsmith Bernardino Delle Croci; the latter, the owner and manager of the commission, already surely had a vast catalog of ancient and modern references and certainly collected others for this commission, all of which are extensively cited both in the major panels and in the minor tondi on the base.

This particular specialization of his, as well as sensitivity in the knowledge and reproduction of ancient bronzes would be, according to Vito Zani, the only reason why he obtained such a challenging commission even in a field outside his expertise, namely stonemasonry. It is difficult, at this point, to exclude Gasparo Cairano, Delle Croci's sculptor partner, from the influence of this quantity of classical examples, although the timing of this influence is very difficult to reconstruct, just as the timing of the monument's creation is confusing. The Scene of Sacrifice alone, however, is able to attest to the maturation, in Cairano's chisel, of this unprecedented union between sculpture and bronzework around 1510, a period in which, at this point, much of the remaining stonework could also be placed. This dialogue with bronzework, moreover, would find at least a sequel in Cairano's catalog of works, namely the altar of San Girolamo for the church of San Francesco d'Assisi in Brescia, where the extraordinary circular adaptation of Mantegna's Zuffa di dei marini is indeed consistent with the similar use, typical of bronzework, of imprinting similar scenes along continuous circular bands. (Note: In this case, the main references could be the Gonzaga Vase at the Galleria Estense in Modena, executed by Pier Jacopo Alari Bonacolsi in c. 1480-1483, and the bases of the three pillars in St. Mark's Square in Venice, executed by Alessandro Leopardi in 1505. Cf. Vito Zani (1 March 2013). "Una copia del Sacrificio del Mausoleo Martinengo e alcune note iconografiche e stilistiche, articolo su www.antiqua.mi.it". Archived from the original on 14 July 2014.)

=== The lost crowning ===
The issue of the lost central crowning of the Martinengo mausoleum, placed between the two apex statues of St. Peter and St. Paul, has raised the questions of critics for years, at least since Antonio Morassi's work on it in the 1930s. The issue found further confirmation after Boselli's discovery of the original 1503 contract in 1977, in which the presence of an upper fastigium is even included among the details that, according to the document, the tomb was supposed to have. The contract also specifies the subject, namely an "imagibus [...] in forma pietatis," that is, a Pietà, consistent with the work's intended use as a funerary monument. The completeness of the stone apparatus, as opposed to the bronze one, suggests that such a crowning was actually made, but later removed or never even hoisted on the mausoleum. The aforementioned 1668 watercolor shows that, by that date, there were already exclusively two corner statues crowning the monument.

The attribution to Gasparo Cairano advanced by Vito Zani in the 2000s led the scholar to propose at least two other conjectures, searching among the erratic works attributable to the sculptor for those that, in all likelihood, might have been part of the Martinengo mausoleum. The first piece is the unfinished Lamentation over the Dead Christ, depicting Christ supported by the Virgin Mary and St. John the Evangelist along with other figures in the background, exhibited in the Museum of Ancient Art in Milan. The second one is the Deposition of Christ in the storage rooms of the Santa Giulia Museum in Brescia, which was also unfinished.

== See also ==
- Gasparo Cairano
- Renaissance art in Bergamo and Brescia

== Bibliography ==
Ancient sources

- Selvatico, Pietro (1847). Sulla scultura e sulla architettura in Venezia dal Medio Evo sino ai giorni nostri. Venezia.
- Nicolò Bettoni, ed. (1822). Le tombe ed i monumenti illustri d'Italia, descritti e delineati con tavole in rame. Milano.

Modern sources

- Giovanni Agosti (1993). "Su Mantegna, I". Prospettiva (71).
- Adriana Augusti (2007). "Riflessi delle scoperte archeologiche sui bronzetti veneti del Cinquecento". In Matteo Ceriana (ed.). Tullio Lombardo. Scultore e architetto nella cultura artistica veneziana del Rinascimento. atti del convegno, Venezia (pubblicato a Verona).
- Andrea Bacchi, Luciana Giacomelli, ed. (2008). "Rinascimento di terra e di fuoco. Figure all'antica e immagini devote nella scultura di Andrea Riccio". Rinascimento e passione per l'antico. Andrea Riccio e il suo tempo. catalogo della mostra, Trento.
- Phyllis Pray Bober; Ruth Olitsky Rubinstein; Susan Woodford (1986). Renaissance sculpture and antique sculpture: a handbook of sources. Londra. OCLC 14099172.
- Boselli, Camillo (1977). Regesto artistico dei notai roganti in Brescia dall'anno 1500 all'anno 1560. Brescia. OCLC 962856611.
- Matteo Ceriana (2003). "L'architettura e la scultura decorativa". In Mario Piana, Wolfgang Wolters (ed.). Santa Maria dei Miracoli a Venezia. La storia, la fabbrica, i restauri. Venezia.
- Fappani, Antonio (1972). Mons. Pietro Capretti. Brescia: Comitato Seminario nuovo. OCLC 878522984.
- Guerrini, Paolo (1930). Una celebre famiglia lombarda. I conti di Martinengo. Studi e ricerche genealogiche. Brescia. OCLC 797820466.
- John Pope-Hennessy (1965). Renaissance bronzes from the Samuel H. Kress collection at the National Gallery of art. Reliefs, plaquettes, statuettes, utensils, mortars. Londra. OCLC 1120132386.
- Alfred Gotthold Meyer (1900). Oberitalienische Frührenaissance. Bauten und Bildwerke der Lombardei (in German). Berlino. OCLC 457768494.
- Antonio Morassi (December 1936). "Per la ricostruzione di Maffeo Olivieri" (PDF). Bollettino d'Arte.
- Morassi, Antonio (1939). Brescia in Catalogo delle cose d'arte e d'antichità d'Italia. Roma.
- Panazza, Gaetano (1958). I Civici Musei e la Pinacoteca di Brescia. Bergamo. OCLC 696012234.
- Bruno Passamani, ed. (1978). Restauri ed acquisizioni 1973-1978. catalogo della mostra, Trento. OCLC 231742095.
- Peroni, Adriano (1963). "L'architettura e la scultura nei secoli XV e XVI". In Giovanni Treccani degli Alfieri (ed.). Storia di Brescia. Brescia: Treccani. OCLC 214941057.
- John Graham Pollard (2007). Renaissance medals. Washington. OCLC 901650601.
- Elena Lucchesi Ragni; Ida Gianfranceschi; Maurizio Mondini, eds. (2003). Il coro delle monache - Cori e corali, catalogo della mostra. Milano: Skira. OCLC 52746424.
- Francesco Rossi (1977). "Maffeo Olivieri e la bronzistica bresciana del '500". Arte Lombarda (47/48): 115–134. JSTOR 43105110.
- Fritz Saxl (1939). "Pagan sacrifice in the italian Renaissance". Journal of the Warburg Institute. 2 (4): 346–367. doi:10.2307/750043. JSTOR 750043.
- Giuseppe Tanfoglio; Fiorenzo Raffaini (2007). San Cristo - Santissimo Corpo di Cristo. Brescia: Tipografia Camuna. OCLC 955149831.
- Vito Zani (December 2001). "Gasparo Coirano. Madonna col Bambino". Spunti per Conversare (5). Milano: Galleria Nella Longari.
- Vito Zani (2003). "Sulle nostalgie di Ambrogio Mazzola, scultore bresciano del Cinquecento". Civiltà Bresciana (XII, 1). Brescia.
- Zani, Vito (2010). Gasparo Cairano e la scultura monumentale del Rinascimento a Brescia (1489-1517 ca.). Roccafranca: La Compagnia della Stampa. OCLC 800227892.
- Zani, Vito (2011). "Maestri e cantieri nel Quattrocento e nella prima metà del Cinquecento". In Valerio Terraroli (ed.). Scultura in Lombardia. Arti plastiche a Brescia e nel Bresciano dal XV al XX secolo. Milano: Skira. OCLC 936152663.
