= Ark of Sant'Apollonio =

Marble monument by Gasparo Cairano in Brescia

The Ark of Sant'Apollonio
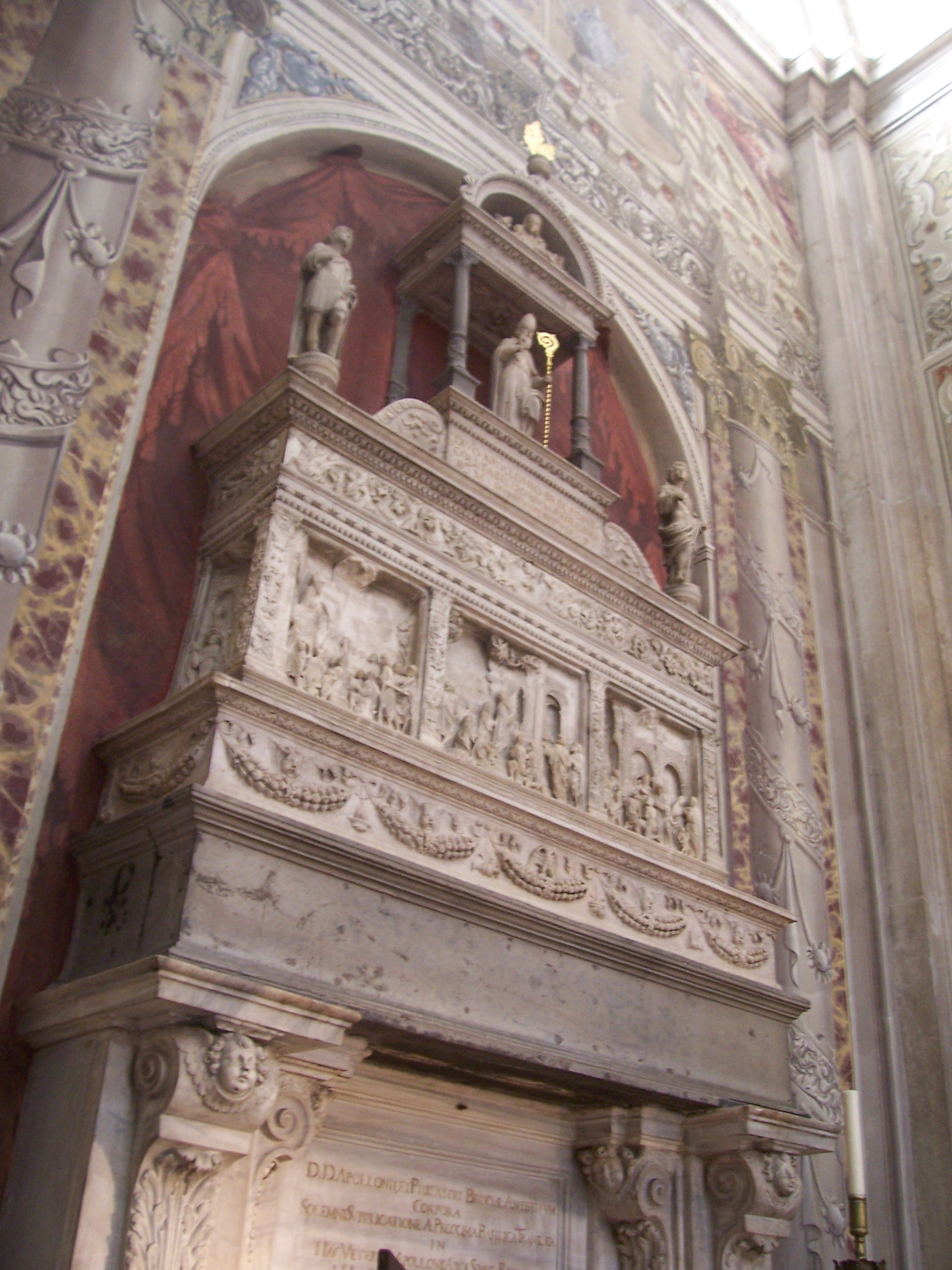
- Artist: Gasparo Cairano
- Year: 1508
- Completion date: 1510
- Medium: Marble
- Movement: Renaissance
- Dimensions: 70 cm × 270 cm × 360 cm (28 in × 110 in × 140 in)
- Location: Duomo Nuovo, Brescia

The Ark of Sant'Apollonio is a funerary monument in marble by Gasparo Cairano. Dated between 1508 and 1510, it is located in the third chapel on the right of the southern nave of the New Cathedral, Brescia.

== History ==
On 5 January 1503, the discovery of the relics of Sant'Apollonio, the fourth bishop of Brescia, in the Basilica of San Pietro de Dom was officially announced. The discovery had likely been made in September 1502 with the finding of documentation of works in his named chapel. The same day, the General Council of the city decided unanimously to provide a worthy emplacement for the remains of the saint, in agreement with diocesan authorities and the cathedral. In June, another resolution of the General Council was made, bidding the College of Notaries to finance the new ark. However, the funds were not immediately committed, most likely because the notaries had had trouble to raise the funds.

Another order from the Council dates to 1506, ordering the College of Notaries to fulfil the work. Finally, in 1508, three people were appointed by the council to preside over the expansion of the chapel of Sant'Apollonio so that it could encompass the marble reliquary ark (archa marmorea et miro artificio fabricata de pecuniis collegii notariorum Brixie). The works are thereby documented from December 1509 through November 1510, with fees for interventions such as the lowering of the floor and the remaking of the walls and the arch, the last by a master Benedictus lapicida. The expenses were considerable, nearly 300 lire planette (the Brescian currency of the time).

The transfer of the relics, officiated by Bishop Mattia Ugoni and attended by notable city authorities as well as papal representatives, took place in July 1510, by which time the ark would have been completed. The execution of the work, therefore, can be placed between 1508 and 1510.

The sculptural complex was transferred to the Old Cathedral in 1604, when the early Christian basilica was beginning to be demolished, to be replaced by the Duomo Nuovo. At this time, relics of Philastrius, another bishop of Brescia from the fourth century, were also placed in the ark. Finally, in 1674, the ark was moved to the Duomo Nuovo, where it is found to this day, in the last of the chapels on the right side of the southern nave, said nave being dedicated to the saints Apollonius and Philastrius. A new altar was built by Carlo Carra and collaborators, comprising two lateral shelves and a central dedicatory inscription, all on a high base. The original supports, possibly columns or pillars, were removed.

== Description ==
The ark comprises three stages: a base, a central body, and the cymatium. The base is made up of two distinct bands of equal width, the first smooth in gray stone and the second in white marble with a decoration of festoons. The central body is the most elaborate from an artistic point of view and has five historiated panels, three on the front and two on the sides, depicting some stories of the life of Saint Apollonius. From the left side panel, proceeding to the right, there are the Imposition of the priestly robes to Saints Faustino and Giovita, the Preaching to the people, the proof of the Eucharist, the baptism of Calocero and the death of Saint Apollonius. The painted panels are inserted in an architectural order of Corinthian pilasters with candelabra, which hold up a thick entablature with an elaborate frieze.

The sculptural complex is topped by the cymatium, consisting of a pedestal bearing a dedicatory inscription, on which is inset a statue of Sant'Apollonio with a crosier in gilded bronze. The canopy is crowned with a lunette bearing a Madonna with Child and angels, in turn completed by a torch from which emanate false gold bronze flames. Two small pedestals flank the canopy, connecting to the central body via stone elements with characteristic wave profiles, above which are statuettes of San Faustino on the left and San Giovita on the right.

== Stylistic assessment and attribution ==
From the seventeenth century onwards, the ark was considered a fine objet d'art in Brescia, especially in catalogues of Brescian saints, that is to say, from the time of its emplacement in the Old Cathedral. Bernardino Faino, for instance, praised the beautiful depiction of the saint (istorie picole del istesso Santo, bellissime), adding that its author is unknown, being from antiquity. Francesco Paglia's Giardino della Pittura (written between 1675 and 1713), in the chapter on the old Cathedral, admired the carved ark with beautiful white marble figurines, that is, the ark of Sant'Apollonio.

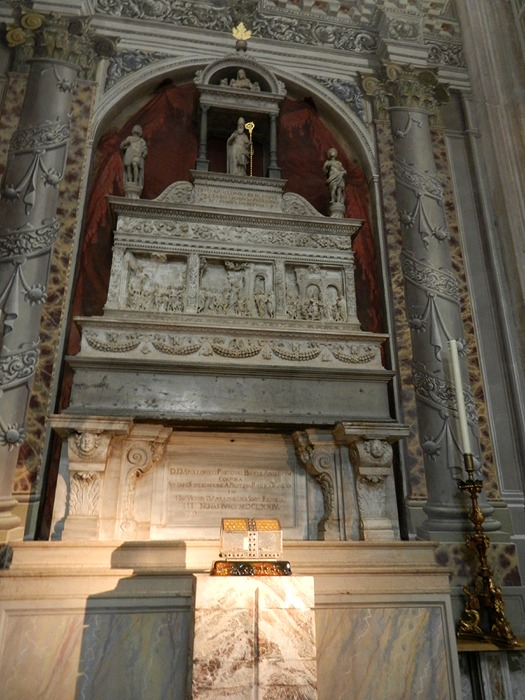
The ark in front view

In 1822, the work was selected from among the historical monuments of Brescia to be included in the Le tombe e i monumenti illustri d'Italia, and given a full page engraving. Paolo Brognoli, in his 1826 guide to Brescia, was the first to conduct a critical analysis of the sculptures in the ark. Following researches in the municipal archives, he was able to reconstruct partially the circumstances of the monument's commission, though he was unable to find the contract with the sculptor who produced the ark. This was of particular interest to him, he said, because he had identified a monument by the same artist, dated to 1494, that was dedicated to Luigi Caprioli. (This was the Caprioli Adoration, and marks the first time that an artistic connection was made with the ark, not based on literary or archival evidence, but purely on stylistic considerations.) In 1939, Antonio Morassi proposed an attribution of the ark to Maffeo Olivieri, which was reasserted by subsequent texts.

Two studies by Vito Zani in 2001 and 2003 proposed the reassignment of the work to Gasparo Cairano, based on stylistic comparisons and historical context. Zani was able to locate identical characteristics between the summit statue of the ark of Sant'Apollonio and the keystone of the portico of the Palazzo della Loggia in Brescia, the latter documented with payments to Cairano in 1497. Zani noted the similarity in the execution of the faces, softening their features but providing the same expressive severity. The same face, austere and calm, can also be found in San Pietro on the portal of the cathedral of Salò, which slightly predated the ark. The ark's two statues of Saints Faustino and Giovita, on the contrary, represent an extreme tribute to the Angels of Tamagnino for the Church of Santa Maria dei Miracoli, against which Cairano, almost twenty years earlier, had opposed his qualitatively inferior Apostles. These references however had been updated, with the heads and hair reshaped, according to the popular model of the contemporary Apostles at the Church of San Pietro in Oliveto. Furthermore, there were obvious technical and expressive similarities between the ark's San Faustino and the left-hand Caesar on the south side of the Loggia carried out between 1503 and 1508. The face of San Faustino has unfinished parts left close to smoothing, worked directly with a flat chisel, proving the virtuosity of the master in sculpting heads.

Other points of similarity occur between the Madonna's face on the ark's cymatium and the female face of Justice on the Loggia's portico, which Cairano then reiterates in the Pala Kress. The middle frieze too supports the attribution to Cairano, its elaborate workmanship reminiscent of the Mausoleum of Martinengo and the altar of San Girolamo, both of which had very similarly executed friezes. The attention paid to the bold perspectives behind the foreground characters also has a precedent in Cairano's career, namely the Caprioli Adoration.

The execution of the ark can be seen in the context of the rivalry between the Sanmicheli and Cairano, whose promotion of a classic style had supplanted the refined decorations of the Sanmicheli in public tastes. For instance, the 1505 Ark of San Tiziano installed in the Church of the Saints Cosma and Damiano by the Sanmicheli as an attempt to relaunch their studio, is largely supplanted by the monumentality and refinement of the figurative parts of the ark of Sant'Apollonio. Cairano thereby established his artistic domination with a production of the highest quality.

== Bibliography ==
- Agosti, Giovanni (1995). "La Loggia di Brescia e la sua piazza. Evoluzione di un fulcro urbano nella storia di mezzo millennio". In Frati, Vasco; Gianfranceschi, Ida; Robecchi, Franco (eds.). Intorno ai Cesari della Loggia di Brescia. Brescia: Grafo.
- Brognoli, Paolo (1826). Nuova guida per la città di Brescia. Brescia.
- Faino, Bernardino (1669). Catalogo delle chiese di Brescia. Brescia.
- Ongaro, Giulio (2016). Peasants and Soldiers: The Management of the Venetian Military Structure in the Mainland Dominion Between the 16th and 17th Centuries. Taylor & Francis. ISBN 978-1-315-29974-7.
- Paglia, Francesco (1713). Il Giardino della Pittura. Brescia.
- Zamboni, Baldassarre (1778). Memorie intorno alle pubbliche fabbriche più insigni della città di Brescia raccolte da Baldassarre Zamboni arciprete di Calvisano. Brescia.
- Zani, Vito (2001). "Gasparo Coirano. Madonna col Bambino". Spunti per Conversare (5). Milano: Galleria Nella Longari.
- Zani, Vito (2003). "Sulle nostalgie di Ambrogio Mazzola, scultore bresciano del Cinquecento". Civiltà Bresciana. XII (1). Brescia.
- Zani, Vito (2007). "Sulle tracce dei Sanmicheli a Brescia e Mantova, tra Quattro e Cinquecento". In Ceriana, Matteo (ed.). Tullio Lombardo. Scultore e architetto nella cultura artistica veneziana del Rinascimento, atti del convegno. Venice.
- Zani, Vito (2010). Gasparo Cairano. Roccafranca: La Compagnia della Stampa.
- Zani, Vito (2011). "Maestri e cantieri nel Quattrocento e nella prima metà del Cinquecento". In Terraroli, Valerio (ed.). Scultura in Lombardia. Arti plastiche a Brescia e nel Bresciano dal XV al XX secolo. Milan: Skira.
- Zani, Vito (2012). "Un marmo lombardo del Rinascimento e qualche precisazione sulla scultura lapidea a Brescia tra Quattro e Cinquecento (terza e ultima parte)". Antiqua (in Italian).

== See also ==
- Gasparo Cairano
