= Vittore Gambello =

Italian sculptor

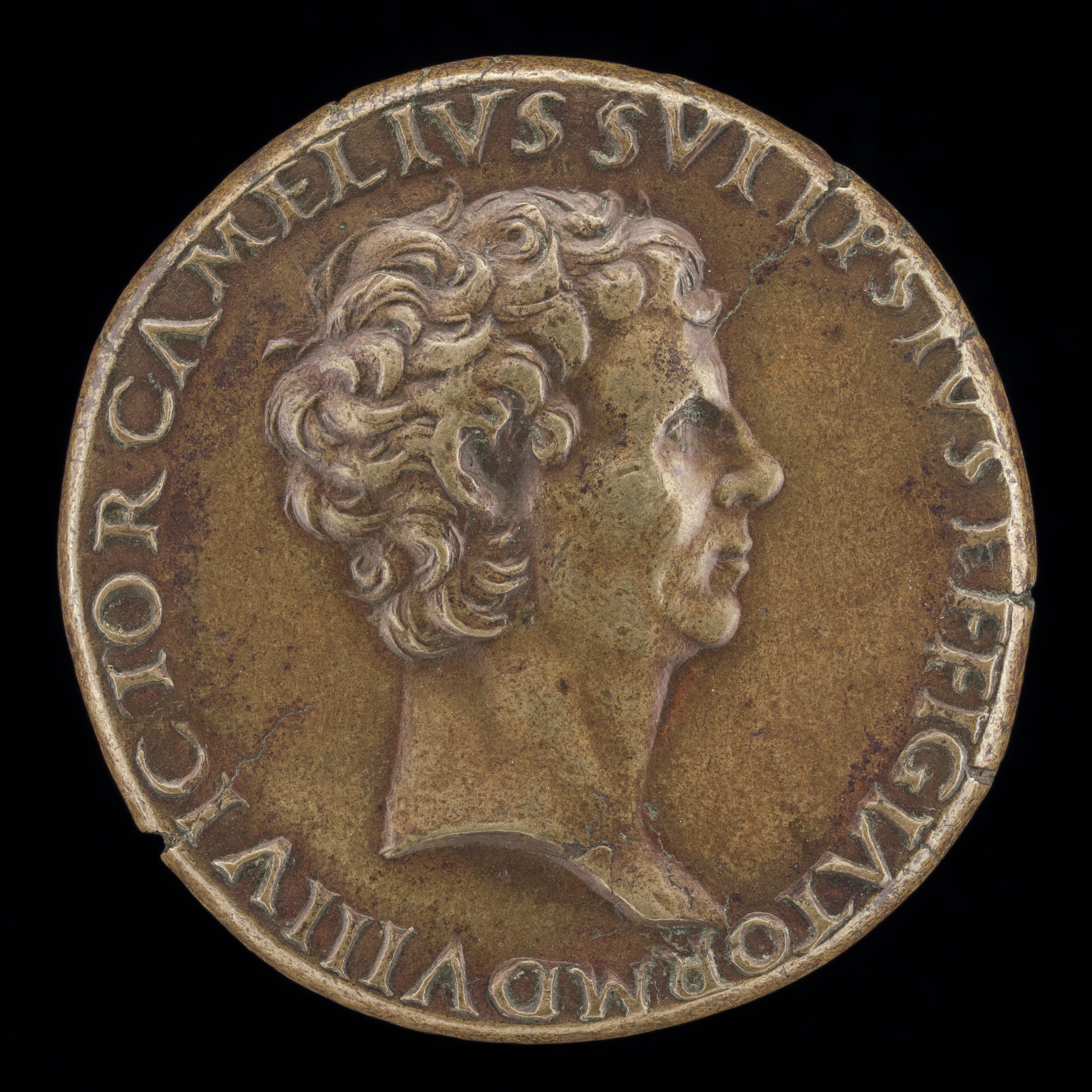
A 1508 self-portrait medal by Gambello, in the collection of the National Gallery of Art

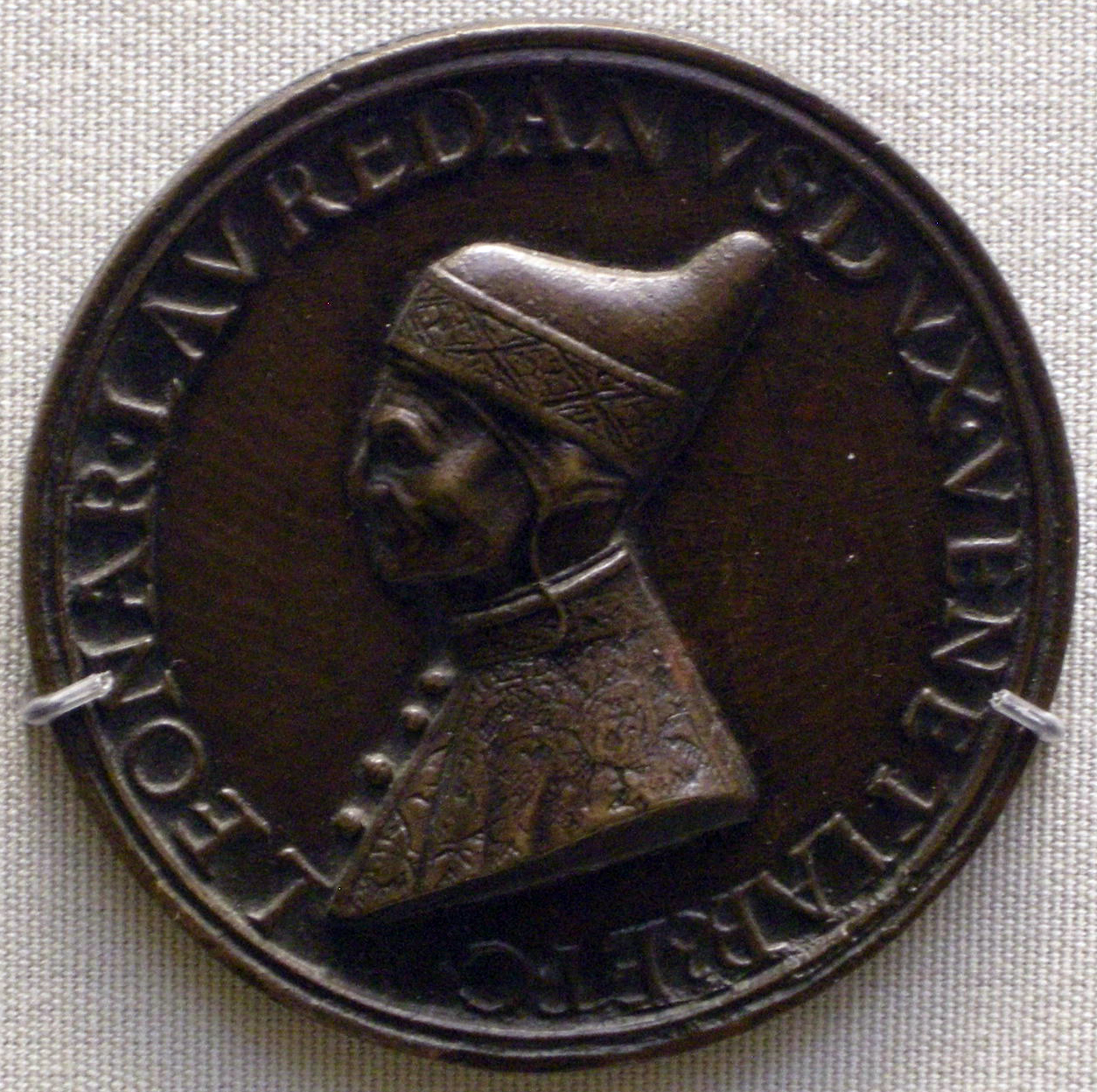
Coin by Vittore Gambello, featuring profile of Leonardo Loredan, British Museum

Vittore Gambello (1460–1537) was an Italian sculptor and medallist.

Gambello was born in Venice, and initially studied drawing under Giovanni Bellini.

He was first noted for his work with medals. Gambello was granted the title "Maestro della Stampe" at the Venetian Mint in 1484. Instead of using the established techniques of casting medals in sand or using the lost-wax process, he perfected a method for stamping medals in high relief. This led to the ability to get more detail and create larger production runs. Some of his works reside at the Cleveland Museum of Art.
