= Maffeo Olivieri =

Italian sculptor

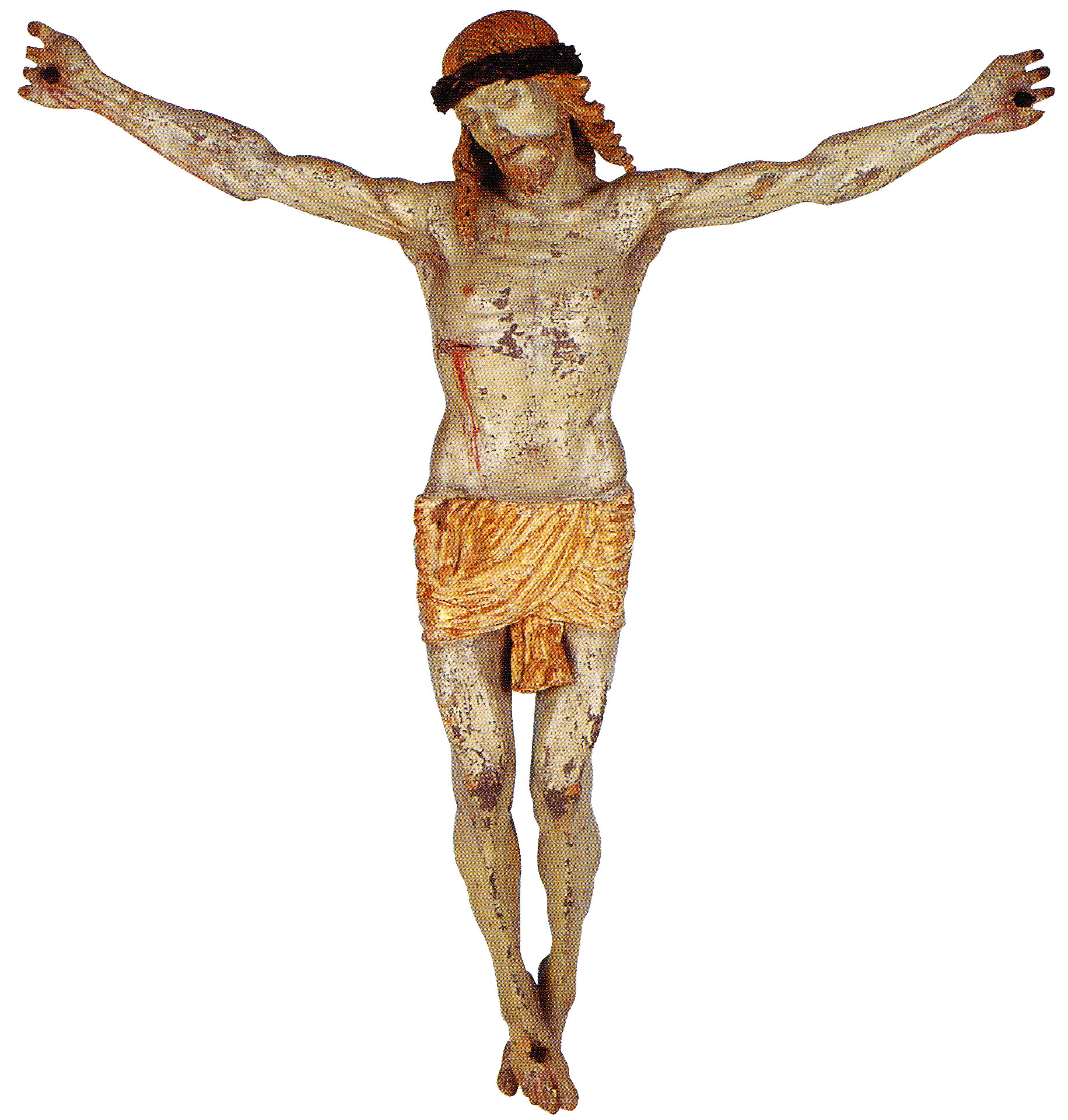
- Crucifix of Botticino, post 1517, Diocesan Museum of Brescia
- Born: 1484
- Died: 1543
- Known for: Sculpture
- Movement: High Renaissance

Maffeo Olivieri (1484 in Brescia – 1543 or 1544) was an Italian sculptor and wood carver. Often associated with his younger brother Andrea, he was active in Lombardy, Venice and Trentino. He was known for his bronze, wood and marble creations, and considered the premier sculptor in early sixteenth century Brescia.

== Artistic re-examination ==
During the twentieth century, Olivieri was the subject of a misunderstanding in the historiography of Renaissance sculpture in Brescia, after Antonio Morassi, in two studies of the 1930s, transformed his biography from that of a bronze artist and woodcarver to the principal Brescian stone sculptor of the early 16th century. The reconstruction, based on an incorrect assumption, i.e. the dating of the Martinengo mausoleum, and conducted purely deductively without the aid of documentary sources, generated considerable confusion in the attribution and cultural framework of many works of art. Only from 1977, with the archival researches of Camillo Boselli, was Maffeo Olivieri's oeuvre restored to its correct artistic sphere, following the organic reconsideration of Gasparo Cairano and his work.

== Works ==
The Botticino Crucifix (located at the Diocesan Museum of Brescia) has been attributed to Olivieri, as well as the Erbusco Crucifix, and the crosses of Lograto and Ghedi. The cross of Sarezzo was executed by Olivieri on the basis of a contract signed on 9 June 1538 for its construction. The wooden statues of Saint Catherine of Alexandria and of Saint Bernard (in Brescia) as well as of Saint Sebastian in Gargnano's Church of San Martino (1530–1535) are also due to him.

In the province of Cremona, in the Church of Santa Maria del Boschetto (Soresina), Olivieri has been identified as the creator of the wooden statuary of the Saints Siro, Giobbe, Rocco and Peter the Martyr, as well as the sculpture of Sant'Antonio Abate located in the sacristy.

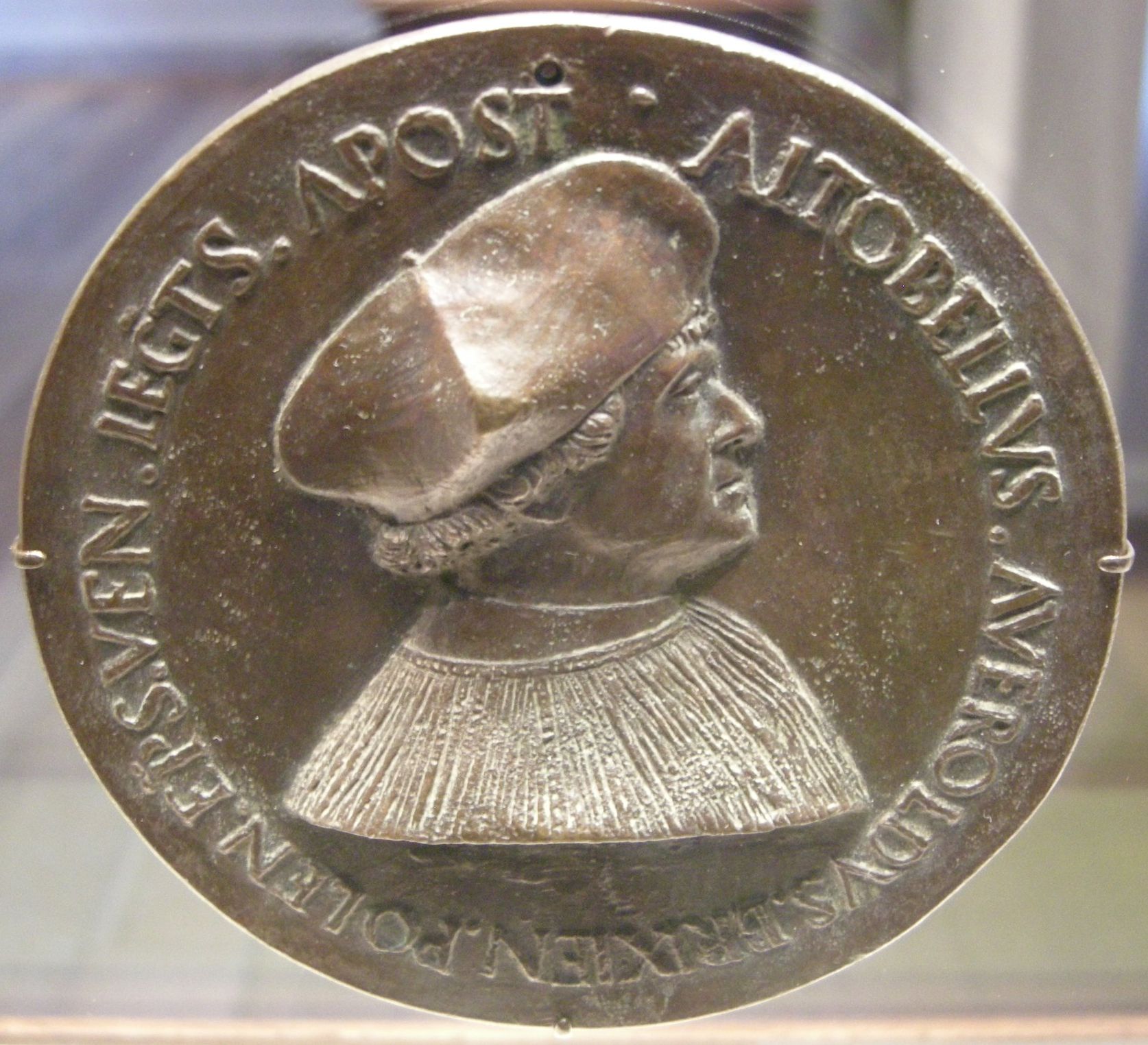
Maffeo Olivieri, Medallion of Altobello Averoldi

In the region of Trentino, Olivieri's first work may have been the altar at Tione di Trento (1515) with the statues of the Madonna and Child with Saints Sebastian and Rocco. This was in collaboration with his brother Andrea, who appears to have assisted him in all his works in the area. Between 1520 and 1530, he built the wooden altar at the Church of Santa Lucia in Giustino. This was previously attributed to Stefano Lamberti. The current structure does not correspond to the original one and likely the group of about twelve sculptures and reliefs, came from two different altars. The statues of Santa Lucia and Sant'Agata, part of the original complex, are currently preserved in the Diocesan Museum of Trento. From the parish of Nago-Torbole come the wooden statues of two Deacons, also preserved in the Diocesan Museum of Trento, after being recovered from its archives and restored. His greatest work in wood carving is considered the monumental altarpiece of the Assunta carved and painted for the church of Santa Maria at Condino, which he began in 1538 and Andrea completed in 1546.

Matteo Olivieri was also a fine bronze-worker in the classical vein. His greatest work in this field are the two candelabra, dated and signed, placed on the sides of the altar of the Chapel of the Madonna of the Mascoli in St Mark's Basilica in Venice, donated by the Brescian Cardinal Altobello de Averoldi. He also created various bronze statuettes in the style of Andrea Briosco: a Bust of a woman, and a Venus with Cupid, now in the Louvre museum, a Meleager in the Museum of Piazza Venezia in Rome. He also produced many medallions, including one for Altobello de Averoldi (around 1520) and others for Venetian patricians; also medallions with allegorical subjects, such as one from the Kress collection and kept at the National Gallery of Art, Washington.

His style has been related to Francesco Giolfino, a Veronese carver active in Brescia in the first half of the sixteenth century.

=== Works reattributed to others ===
The bronze and stone apparatus of the Mausoleum of Martinengo in the Museum of Santa Giulia, Brescia, the ark of Sant'Appollonio in the Duomo Nuovo of Brescia, the altar of San Girolamo at the Church of Saint Francis of Assisi were all restored to Gasparo Cairano's oeuvre in the 2000s, while the bronze statues of the Martinengo mausoleum have been shown to be the works of Bernardino delle Croci.

The funeral monuments of Altobello de Averoldi and Raffaele Riario in the Santi Nazaro e Celso, Brescia were reattributed to Lorenzo Bregno in 1990.

== Bibliography ==
- Begni Redona, Pier Virgilio (2004). "Quattrocento anni di storia dell'arte a Brescia - Pittura e scultura nel Duomo nuovo". In Taccolini, Marco (ed.). Il Duomo nuovo di Brescia - Quattro secoli di arte, storia, fede. Brescia: Grafo.
- Bode, Wilhelm von (1907). Draper, James David (ed.). The Italian Bronze Statuettes of the Renaissance. Translated by William Grétor.
- Boselli, Camillo (1977). Regesto artistico dei notai roganti in Brescia dall'anno 1500 all'anno 1560. Brescia.
- Ceriana, Matteo (1994). "Considerazioni su Giovanbattista e Lorenzo Bregno". Venezia Arti (8).
- Hill, George Francis (1920). Medals of the Renaissance. Clarendon. ISBN 9780714108438.
- Hourihane, Colum, ed. (2012). "Brescia". The Grove Encyclopedia of Medieval Art and Architecture. Vol. 1. Oxford University. ISBN 9780195395365.
- Markham Schulz, Anne (1996). "Addenda to the life and works of Lorenzo Bregno". La scultura. Studi in onore di Andrew S. Ciechanowiecki. Antologia di Belle Arti.
- Morassi, Antonio (1936). "Per la ricostruzione di Maffeo Olivieri". Bollettino d'Arte. XXX (6).
- Morassi, Antonio (1939). Catalogo delle cose d'arte e d'antichità d'Italia. Brescia. Rome.
- Lucchesi Ragni, Elena; Gianfranceschi, Ida; Mondini, Maurizio (2003). Il coro delle monache - Cori e corali (catalogo della mostra). Milano: Skira.
- Zani, Vito (2010). Gasparo Cairano. Roccafranca: La Compagnia della Stampa.
