= Bernardino delle Croci =

Italian goldsmith and sculptor

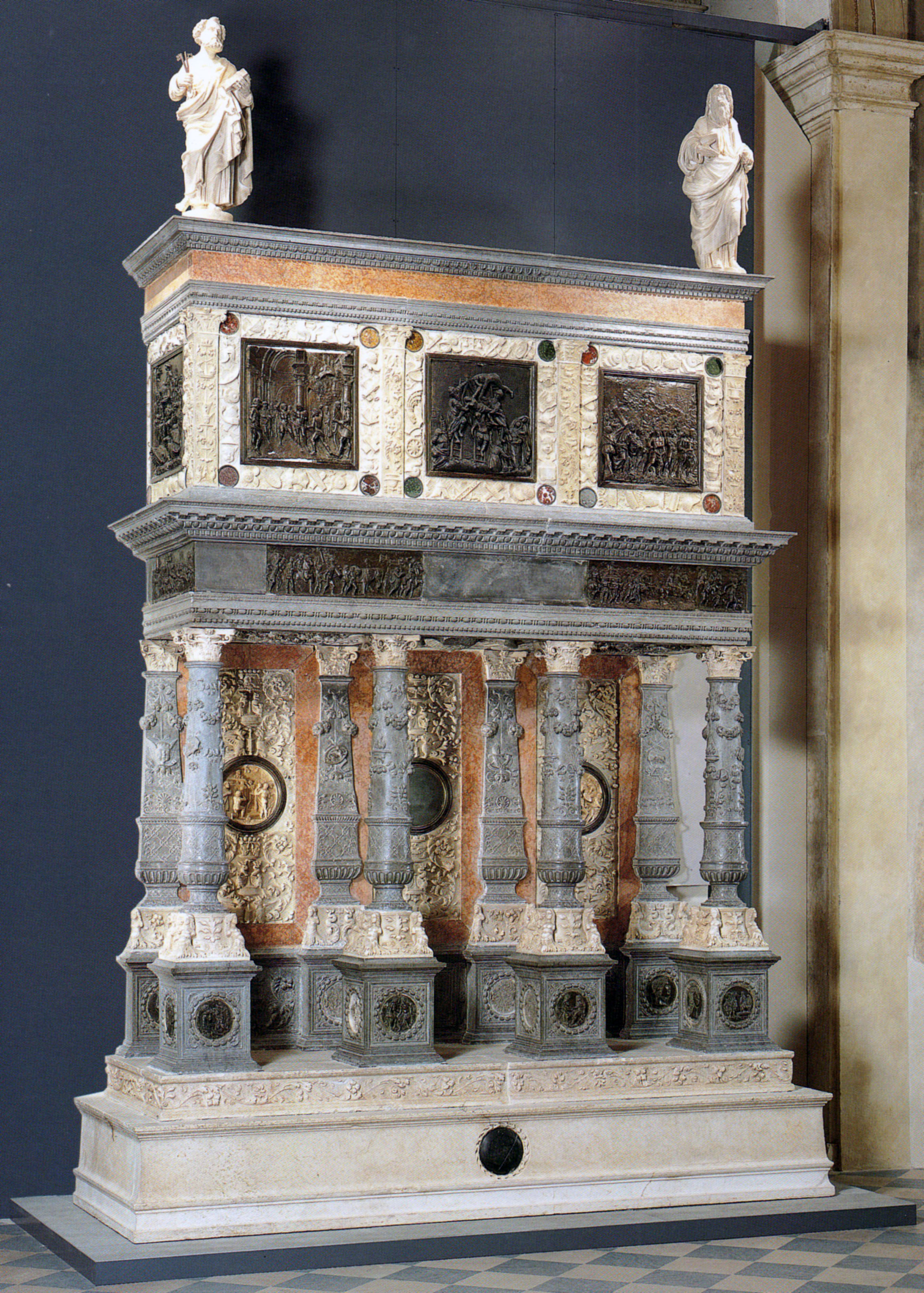
- Bernardino delle Croci and Gasparo Cairano, Mausoleum of Martinengo, 1503–1517, Brescia
- Born: second half of 15th century Parma
- Died: 1528–1530; Brescia
- Known for: goldsmith, sculpture
- Movement: High Renaissance

Bernardino delle Croci (born Parma; died between 1528 and 1530 in Brescia) was an Italian goldsmith and sculptor of the Brescian Renaissance. He was also the founder of the Delle Croci family of important goldsmiths and sculptors, known for their specialism in processional crosses, reliquaries and altars.

== Life ==
Bernardino, born in Parma, was the son of Giacomino. The exact year of his birth is not known; it is likely to have been in the middle of the fifteenth century. His presence in Brescia is documented by a 1486 estimus stating he lives near the Porta Bruciata. However, this was not the year he arrived in Brescia: in 1487, he received the balance of payment for the pedestal of the reliquary of the Holy Cross in the Duomo Vecchio, which had been commissioned following deliberations by the city's special council on 12 August 1474. A contract from 23 March 1477 documents his agreement to work on a tabernacle for the Dominican friars.

Attached to the School of the Blessed Sacrament of the Basilica of San Pietro de Dom, he was appointed among the members overseeing work on the fraternity's altar by Vincenzo Foppa, a Brescian painter, on 1 May 1501. Between 1503 and 1517, he is documented to have been involved in the execution of Mausoleum of Martinengo for the Santissimo Corpo di Christo church in Brescia, along with Gasparo Cairano.

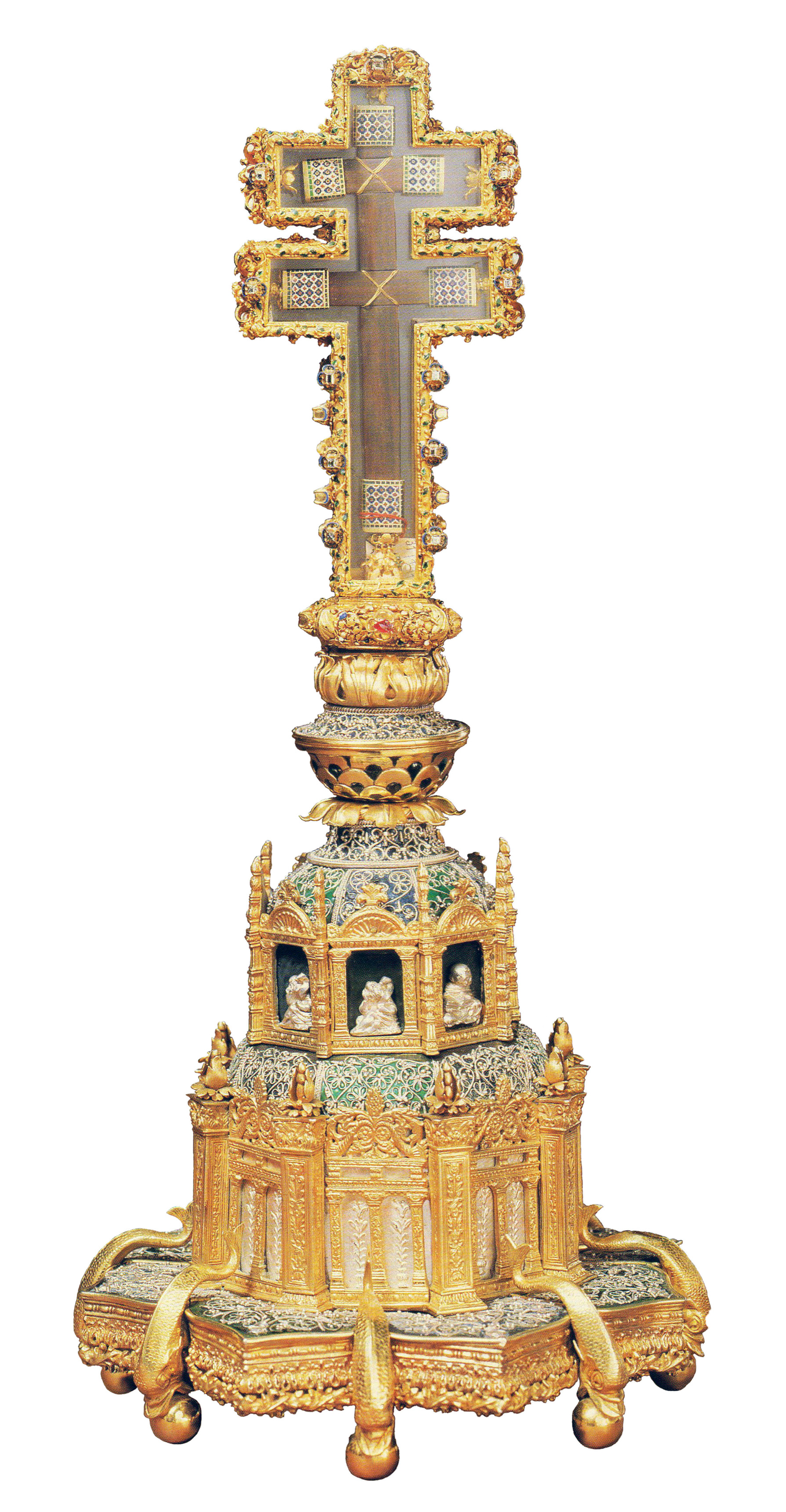
Bernardino delle Croci, Reliquary of the Holy Cross, 1474–1484, Old Cathedral, Brescia

On 4 August 1521, the Observant Friars Minor of the San Giuseppe monastery granted him permission to build a chapel at his own expense in their church. The ninth location along the left aisle of the church, first dedicated to San Bernardo and then to San Guglielmo became the burial crypt of the delle Croci family.

There is documentation of his position as provost or prior of the San Giuseppe monastery between 1519 and April 1528.

An erroneous transcription of Pandolfo Nassino's manuscript by Andrea Valentini in 1882 resulted in Bernardino's death being assigned as 6 June 1528. In the manuscript, however, there is only a reference to the purchase of some land by Bernardino and the murder of one of his sons, possibly Giovanni Francesco, by Giovan Giacomo Savallo on 6 July 1528. Bernardino's death would have occurred between 1528 and 1530, because a document of 7 January 1531 already references his passing.

== Style ==
Bernardino delle Croci by unanimous acclaim of contemporary and modern critics has been recognised as one of the finest goldsmiths of Renaissance Lombardy and of the best interpreters of the proto-Renaissance styles that began spreading through Lombardy by the end of the 15th century. In turn, his descendants inherited his talent, becoming some of the most important exponents of gold craft in 16th century Brescian art.

== Works ==
Bernardino and his sons probably specialised in crucifixes and crosses, which is why he is known by the surname delle Croci (of the Crosses) or dalle Croci, and Bernardinus de Parma dictus de le Crucibus. However, only two works – the reliquary of the Holy Cross, and the bronze works of the Martinengo mausoleum – can be directly attributed to him.

There are numerous works in which his children collaborated, making the sole attribution to him impossible. There is evidence of his imprint in the Sante Spine reliquary, the San Faustino cross, as well as other similar works making constant references to Gothic art. Indeed, the innovative update of classical bronze styles in Bernardino's bronzes for the Martinengo mausoleum suggests that his studio very quickly adapted to the new canon, with the cross of San Francesco being a fine exemplar of the style, executed by his son Giovanni Francesco.

== Bibliography ==
- Boselli, Camillo (1977). "Regesto artistico dei notai roganti in Brescia dall'anno 1500 all'anno 1560". Commentari dell'Ateneo di Brescia per l'anno 1976. Vol. I. Brescia.
- Fappani, Antonio (1978). Enciclopedia Bresciana. Vol. III. Brescia.
- Guerrini, Paolo (1951). "La scuola del duomo. Notizie inedite sugli artisti bresciani che vi appartennero". Memorie storiche della diocesi di Brescia - XVIII. Brescia.
- Massa, Renata (1986). "Delle Croci, Bernardino". Biographical Dictionary of Italians. Vol. 32.
- Massa, Renata (1997). "Reliquiario delle Sante Spine". Nel lume del Rinascimento: exhibition catalogue. Brescia: Museo diocesano di Brescia.
- Panazza, Gaetano (1958). "Il tesoro delle Santissime Croci nel duomo vecchio di Brescia". Commentari dell'Ateneo di Brescia per l'anno 1957. Brescia.
- Ragni, Elena Lucchesi; Gianfranceschi, Ida; Mondini, Maurizio (2003). Il coro delle monache - Cori e corali: exhibition catalogue. Milano: Skira.
- Begni Redona, Pier Virgilio (1997). "Croce processionale di San Francesco". Nel lume del Rinascimento: exhibition catalogue. Brescia: Museo diocesano di Brescia.
- Prestini, Rossana (1978). Storia e arte nel convento di S. Giuseppe in Brescia. Bornato.
- Rossi, Francesco (1977). "Maffeo Olivieri e la bronzistica bresciana del '500". Arte Lombarda (47/48).
- Valentini, Andrea (1882). Le Santissime Croci di Brescia illustrate. Brescia.
- Zani, Vito (2010). Gasparo Cairano. Roccafranca: La Compagnia della Stampa.
