= Torre dell'Orologio, Brescia =

Coordinates: 45°32′23″N 10°13′14″E

Clock Tower
- Torre dell'Orologio
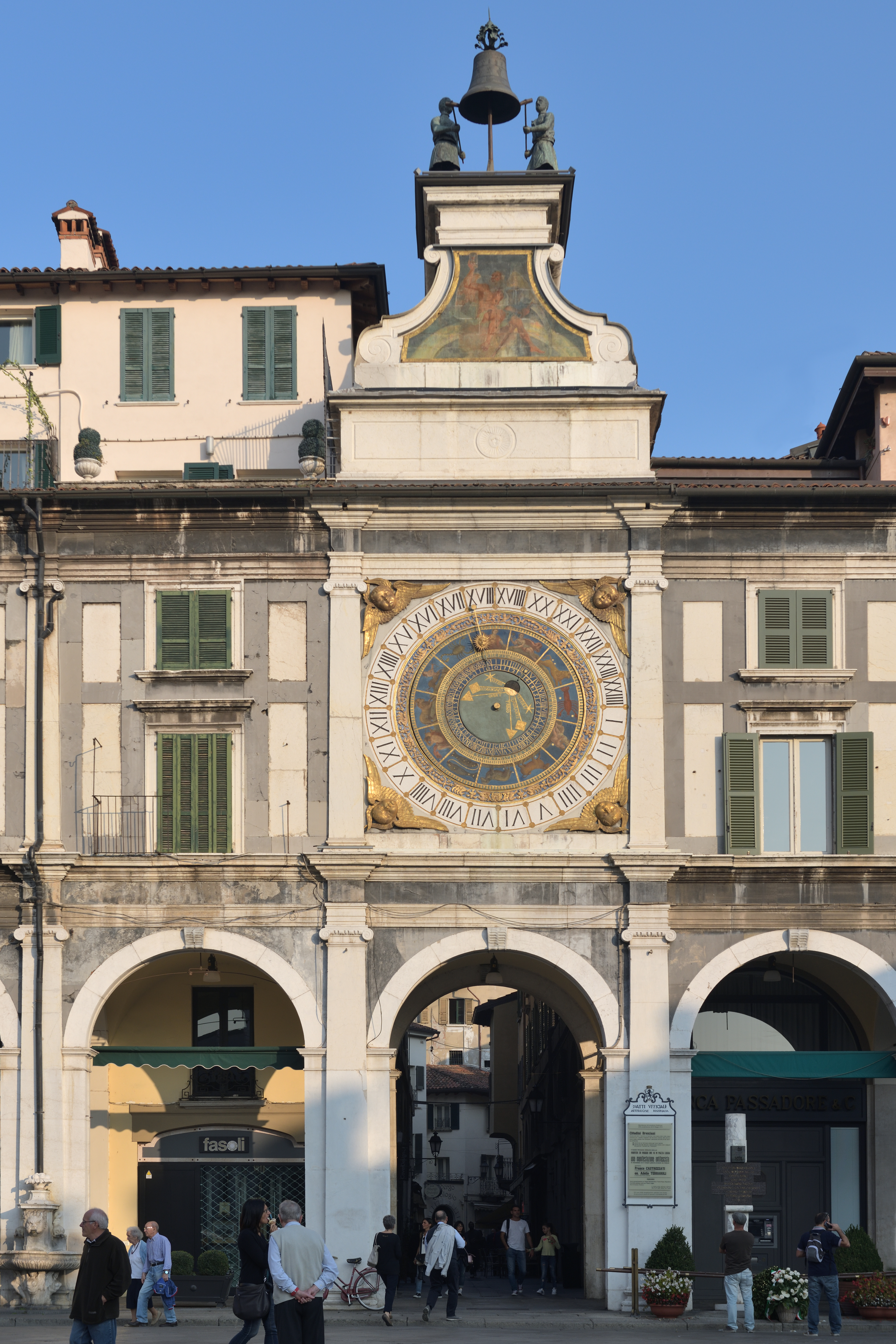

General information
- Status: In use
- Architectural style: Renaissance
- Location: Piazza della Loggia, Brescia, Italy
- Construction started: 1540-1550

Design and construction
- Architect: Ludovico Beretta

The Torre dell'Orologio (English: Clock Tower) is a 16th-century building located in the Piazza della Loggia in Brescia, northern Italy.

== History ==
The tower was constructed between 1540 and 1550 to the design of Ludovico Beretta, a Brescian architect and one of the designers of the Palazzo della Loggia. In 1543 the present clock replaced the one built in the previous century. It houses a complex astronomical clock installed by Paolo Gennari from Rezzato between 1544 and 1546. The clock-face was realised by Gian Giacomo Lamberti in 1547, while the automatons, the Macc de le ure, were installed in 1581.

== Description ==
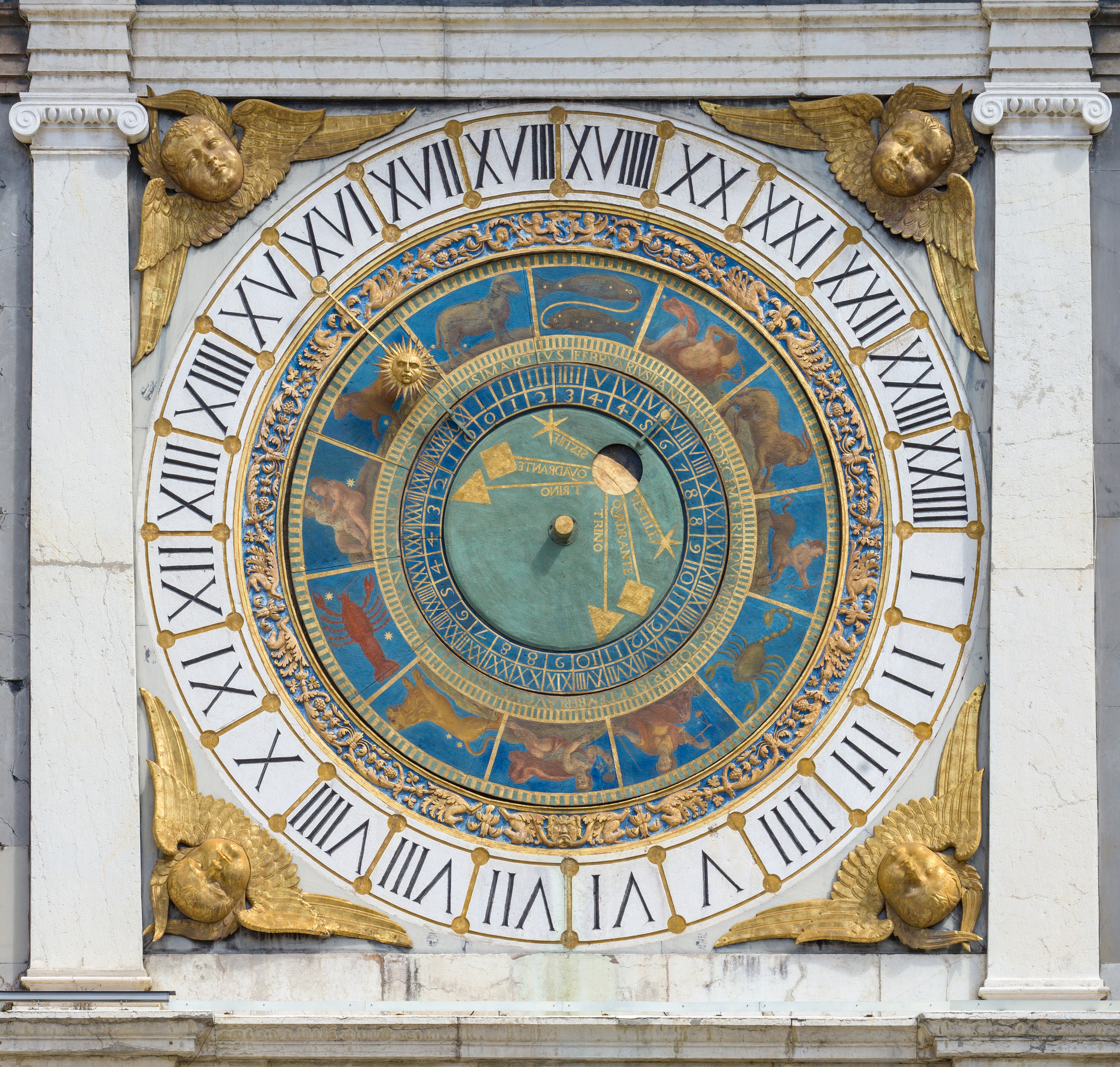
Close-up of the clock face

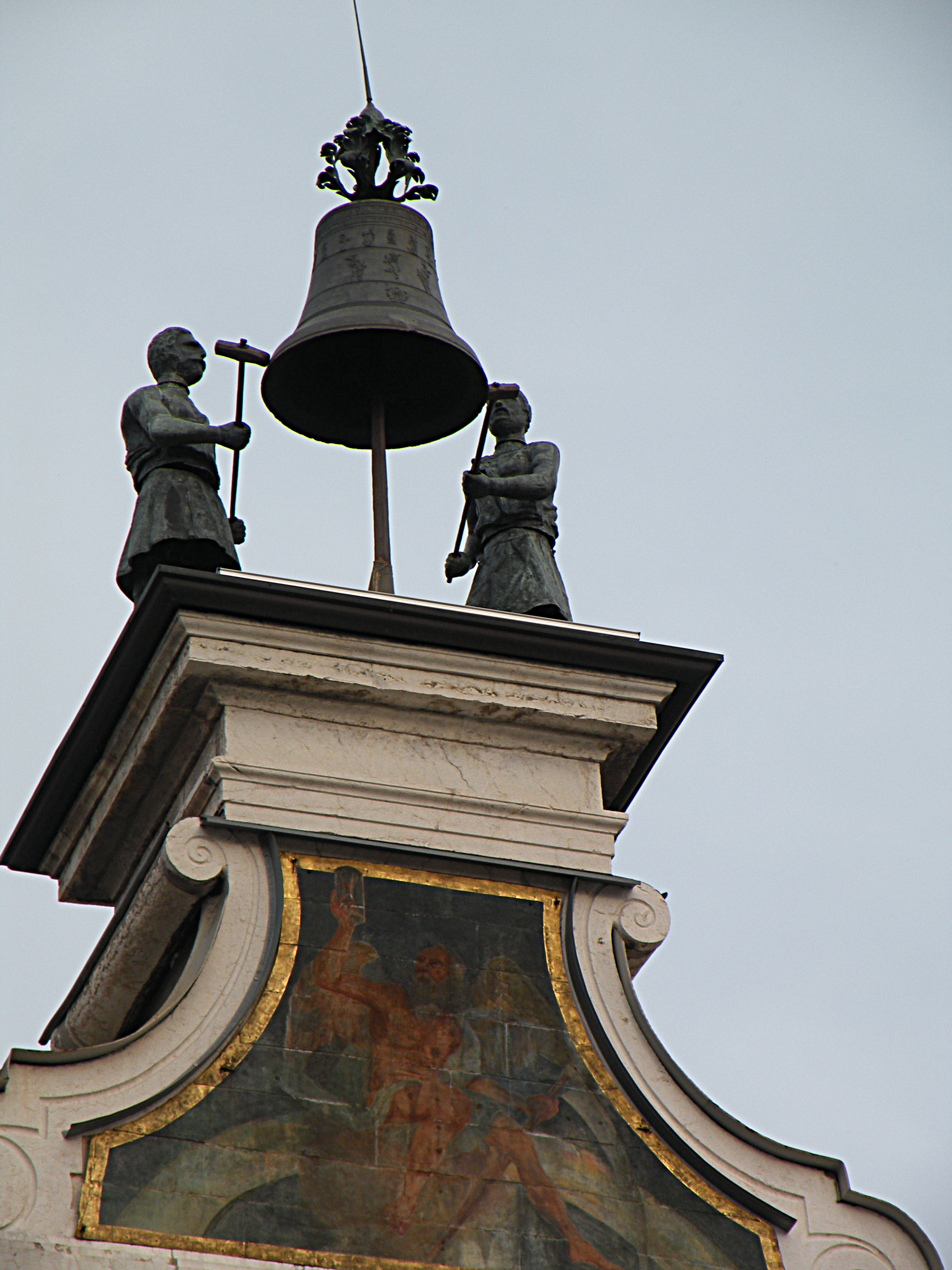
The Màcc de le ure and fresco depicting Saturn or Chronos

The chapter ring of the dial is divided into twenty-four hours. The hour hand, which carries a golden sun, indicates the hour, and the Sun's position in the zodiac and the date on a ring inside the chapter ring. The centre of the dial shows the age and phase of the Moon, with lines indicating astrological aspects.

The clock visibly predates the Gregorian calendar reform in 1582 that suppressed ten days of the previous calendar: the position of the spring equinox is set to 11 March instead of 21 March.

Above the dial is a painted fresco of Saturn or Chronos, the personification of time.

The tower is topped with a bronze bell, which has engravings depicting the Madonna and Child, Christ crucified, the Patron saints, the lion rampant, the patrons Faustino and Giovita and the coat of arms of the creator Nicola Cattaneo. The two copper jacquemarts, which are driven by the clock mechanism and strike the hours, were installed in 1581. In Brescian dialect they are known as the "Màcc de le ure" (the madmen of the hours) or "Tone and Batista", a nickname acquired following the French Revolution.

The clock's main dial and its tympanum were painted by Gian Giacomo Lamberti in 1547. A second dial, at the back of the tower overlooking the Via Beccaria, indicates only the hour. Its designer is unidentified.

In 1595 the Brescian architect Piermaria Bagnadore built a long portico in white stone. Afterwards, the passage underneath the tower, connecting the Piazza della Loggia with the Via Beccaria and the Piazza Paolo VI, was constructed by Lodovico Beretta in 1554.
