= Santa Maria dei Miracoli, Brescia =

Church in Brescia, Italy

Coordinates: 45.537268°N 10.214893°E

Santa Maria dei Miracoli
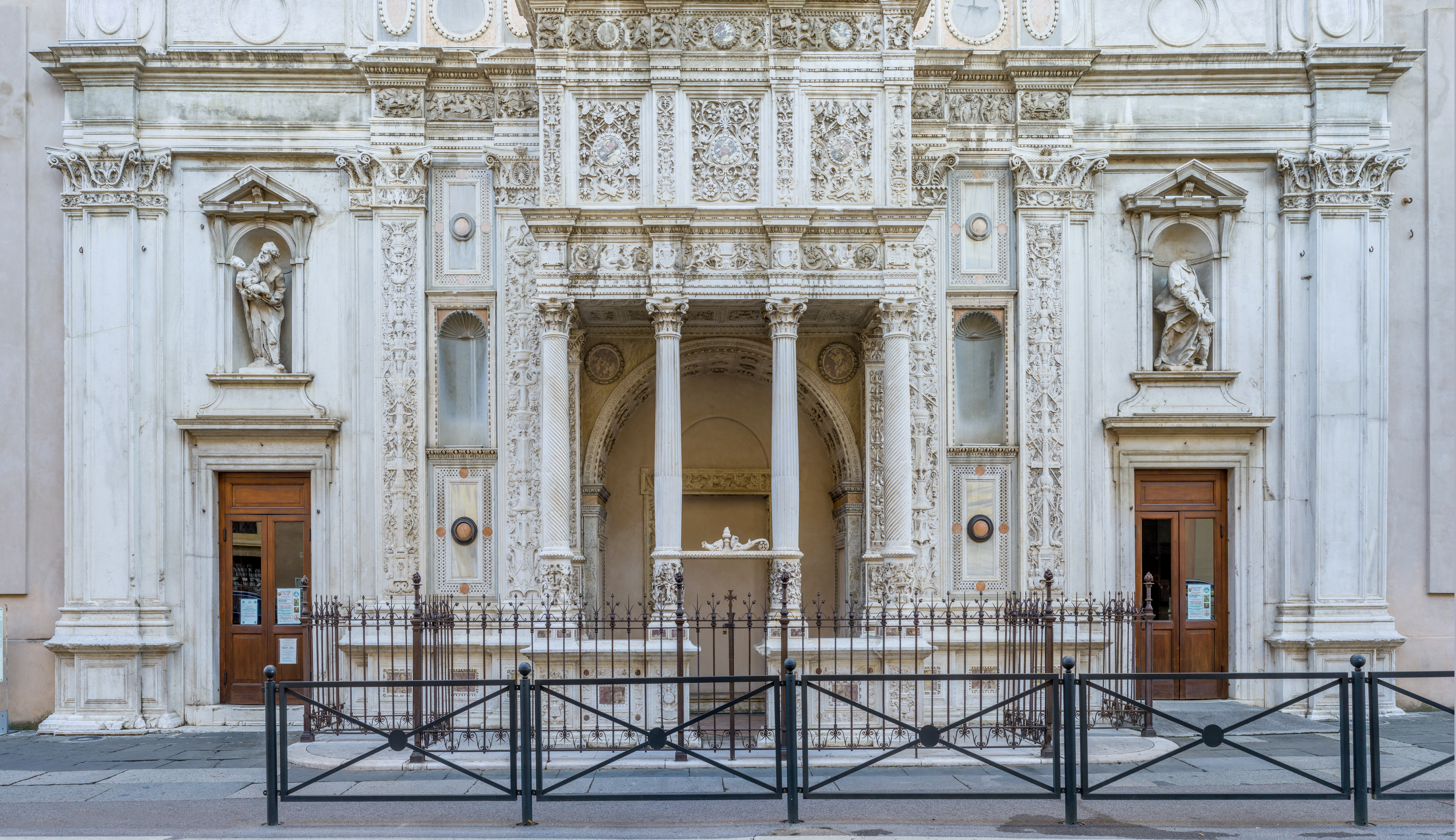

Religion
- Affiliation: Roman Catholic
- Province: Brescia

Location
- Location: Brescia, Italy
- Interactive map of Santa Maria dei Miracoli

Architecture
- Architects: Giovanni Antonio Amadeo and Ludovico Beretta
- Type: Renaissance façade
- Groundbreaking: 1487
- Completed: 1490

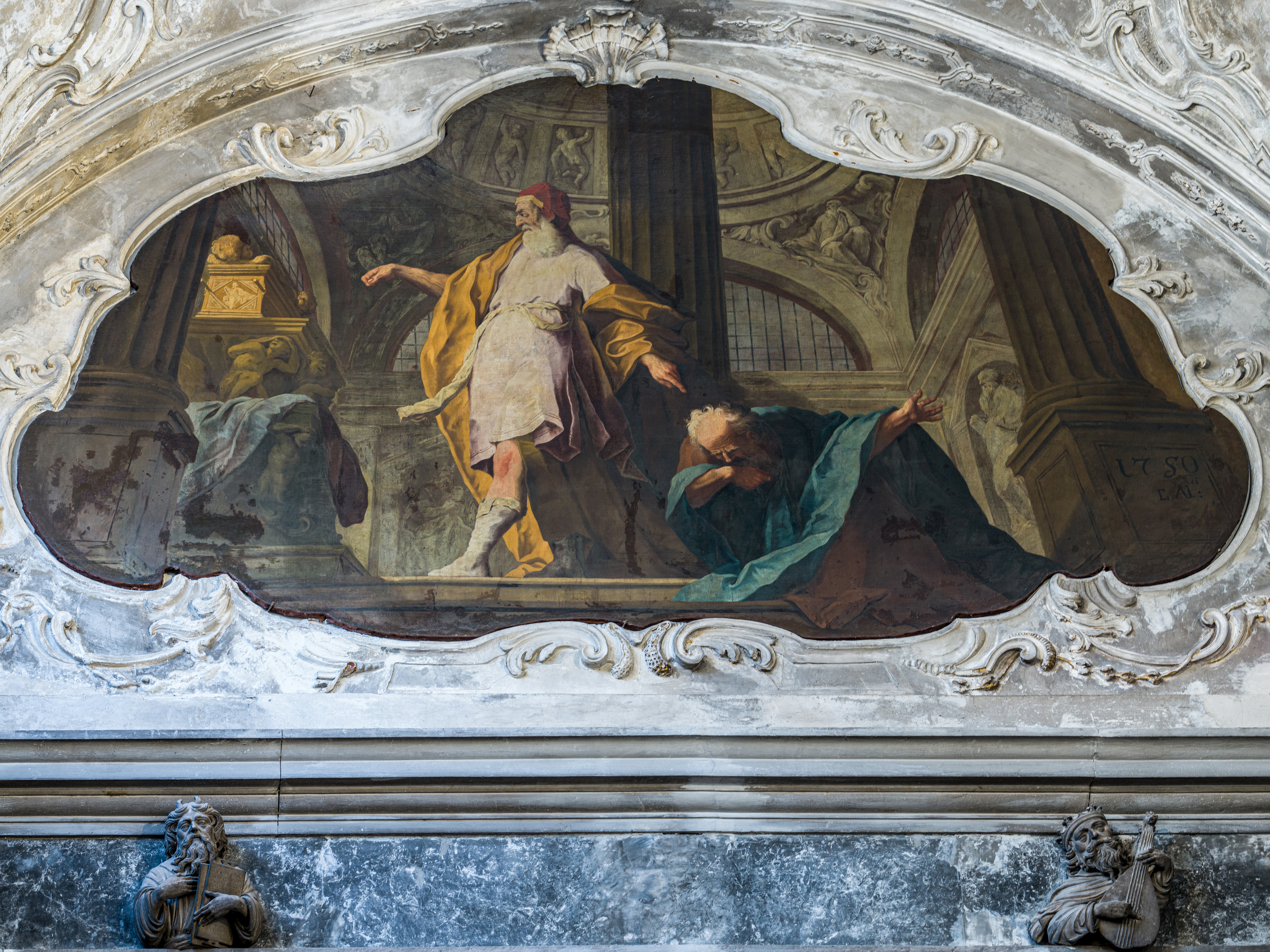
Lunette painting (oil on canvas) dated and signed “1750 E Al:” (Enrico Albrici), representing the parable of the Pharisee and the Publican.

The church of Santa Maria dei Miracoli is located on Corso Martiri della Libertà in Brescia.

== History ==
Following a plague that afflicted Brescia between 1480 and 1484, there were rumours that a votive fresco depicting the Madonna and Child in front of a house in the San Nazario quarter had developed miraculous powers. On the wave of popular religious fervour, the Catholic church began negotiations in 1486 for the purchase of the house. In 1488, the construction of the church began.

The interior, but not the façade, of the church was severely damaged by bombardment during the Second World War. The exterior was protected by wooden scaffolding. The interior has been subsequently restored.

== Architecture ==
The church plan with its cylindrical anterior dome was designed by Ludovico Beretta before 1490. The most striking element is the elaborately decorated marble reliefs in the façade screen and portico designed by Giovanni Antonio Amadeo, and completed with the help of a large number of sculptors, including the recently arrived Sanmicheli. The sculpted profusion recalls the Renaissance exterior of the Charterhouse of Pavia.

The porch, added later, is divided into four columns by straight grooves which rest all on one high base and supporting a rectangular tribune, in a turn topped by a narrow kiosk with triangular pediment. The interior is a square divided into three naves by pillars and columns, with a pentagonal apse.

== Art ==
The work of the Sanmicheli corresponding to the base level was the most refined of the façade, and was accomplished by the year 1500. Meanwhile, the religious building underwent rapid development, thanks to the growing number of worshippers and their alms, and was expanded to its current size. The architectural scores in the interior, characterized by decorative characters are attributed to Gasparo Cairano and his studio. The same sculptor also executed the cycle of the Apostles for the first dome, interspersed with the cycle of Angels by Tamagnino, all of which were delivered and paid for in 1489.

Over the centuries, the sanctuary was enriched by artistic works, mainly paintings, including a compelling canvas of St Nicholas of Bari presenting two children to the Virgin (1539) by Moretto, which is now in the Pinacoteca Tosio Martinengo. Grazio Cossali's frescoes on the Baptism of Christ and Adoration by the Shepherds are still in the church. The cycle of canvases of the Life of Jesus, painted by a number of artists including Tommaso Bona and Piermaria Bagnadore, is found in the presbytery.
