= Maria Maggi =

Maria Maggi may refer to:

- Eva Perón was buried under the name "Maria Maggi"
- Maria Maggi, a terrorist involved with the Piazza della Loggia bombing
