= Palazzo Averoldi =

Building in Brescia, Italy

Coordinates: 45°32′09″N 10°12′53″E

- The 16th-century facade of the palace facing Moretto Street
- Interactive map of the Palazzo Averoldi area

General information
- Status: In use
- Location: Via Moretto, 12, Brescia, Italy
- Year built: 16th century
- Client: Averoldi family
- Owner: Rotary Club and Casa di Dio

Design and construction
- Architects: Ludovico Beretta; Pietro Isabello; Marcantonio Isabello

Palazzo Averoldi is a historic building in Brescia located on Via Moretto at number 12. It was built starting in the 16th century in the middle of the southern historic center, in what was once the so-called Quadra di San Giovanni.

Built at the behest of the powerful and influential Averoldi family, the aristocratic palace represents one of the greatest examples of Brescian artistic production in the civic sphere and contains, in its rooms and interior halls, important decorations and frescoes from the 16th-century period by painters such as Romanino and Lattanzio Gambara, two of the major protagonists of Brescian art during the period between Renaissance and Mannerism.

== History ==
=== A new palace ===
Toward the end of the 15th century, Giovan Paolo Averoldi, "a most virtuous and devout man," purchased several pieces of land from the Porcellaga family in the vicinity of the city walls, in the then Contrada di Santa Croce, also known as Contrada del Bue, or even "della fontana del bò." He, in doing so, separated himself from the other branches of the family, all of whom lived near what is known in modern times as Via Marsala and was once called Contrada di Monzia; Giovan Paolo himself chose as the area to build his palace the fifth Quadra di San Giovanni, (Note: In a bill dated 1517, Giovan Paolo had many children in his care, but also a large number of domestic servants (a total of 21 mouths to feed, with four horses, plus "the usual guests"); in the same bill it is said by Giovan Paolo that "in the house in S. Croce I cannot stay with so much family since I have to spend on building at least 1,500 ducats to be uncomfortable." For more on this, see Lechi, p. 330, n.° 8.)) a sector of the city also known as Borgo San Nazaro. The area, which took its name from the nearby San Nazaro gate and was then characterized by a strong artisan tradition, was precisely in the vicinity of the walls and constituted, among other things, a privileged access point for those entering Brescia through the city walls.

=== The beginning of the construction ===
Construction of the noble palace, nevertheless, began only from 1544 onward. It was the four sons of the aforementioned Giovan Paolo Averoldi who initiated the construction of the mansion: (Note: The start of the work is commemorated by an epigraph placed on the entrance hall of the building.) Giovan Andrea, Leandro, Mario, and Fulgenzio, on the aforementioned date, entered into a contract with the Bergamasque architects and military engineers Pietro Isabello and his son Marcantonio; the two designers were commissioned both to design the new mansion from scratch and to adapt the pre-existing hovels and buildings in the area of the service courtyard. It is highly probable, moreover, that the work was conducted rather expeditiously, also by virtue of the fact that, again according to the terms of the stipulated contract, the fee would not be rendered unless certain timelines of the construction site were met.

A few months after the contract was signed, Giovan Andrea Averoldi, speaking also on behalf of the other three brothers, approached the city council to request the cession of another public area, so that they could "make a building which is well designed and built according to the canons of architecture"; in return, part of their property was ceded by the Averoldi family to both the south and the north, so that the adjacent public road could be widened.

=== An extensive period of construction ===
The eastern wing of the palace was built with a certain celerity, since, only six months after the beginning of the work, it was already completed. Proof of this is the testimony provided by the Augustinian nuns of the neighboring monastery of Santa Croce: the latter, precisely as a result of the construction of the aforementioned wing of the palace, asked the city council for permission to raise the perimeter wall of their building further, so that they could not be seen from the windows of the palace. Work on the building, in any case, did not proceed very expeditiously: the testimony of Leandro Averoldi, dating back to 1548, reports that it was still necessary to incur substantial expenses to finish its construction; twenty years later, it is even said that there was "more than half of it still to be built."

Nevertheless, at the end of the eighteenth century, the palace and in particular the noble floor were affected by a new phase of building and artistic commissions: at the behest of the brothers Giuseppe and Faustino Chizzola, then owners of the property, the architect Giovanni Donegani and artists such as Giuseppe Manfredini, Giuseppe Teosa, as well as ornamentalists such as Saverio Gandini, Francesco Tellaroli and Ferdinando Pellizzari were commissioned. (Note: Among these names, moreover, the name of Sante Cattaneo should also be included, as evidenced also by the presence, in the Averoldi fund, of a receipt with the costs of the interventions, in which precisely a certain "Santino" is named. See Boselli, p. 96.)) The rooms were frescoed between 1788 and 1796 and feature, on the whole, a reworking in a pre-Romantic style of seventeenth-century themes, also taking up motifs and stylistic features of classical art.

== Description ==
=== Floor plan and architectural set ===
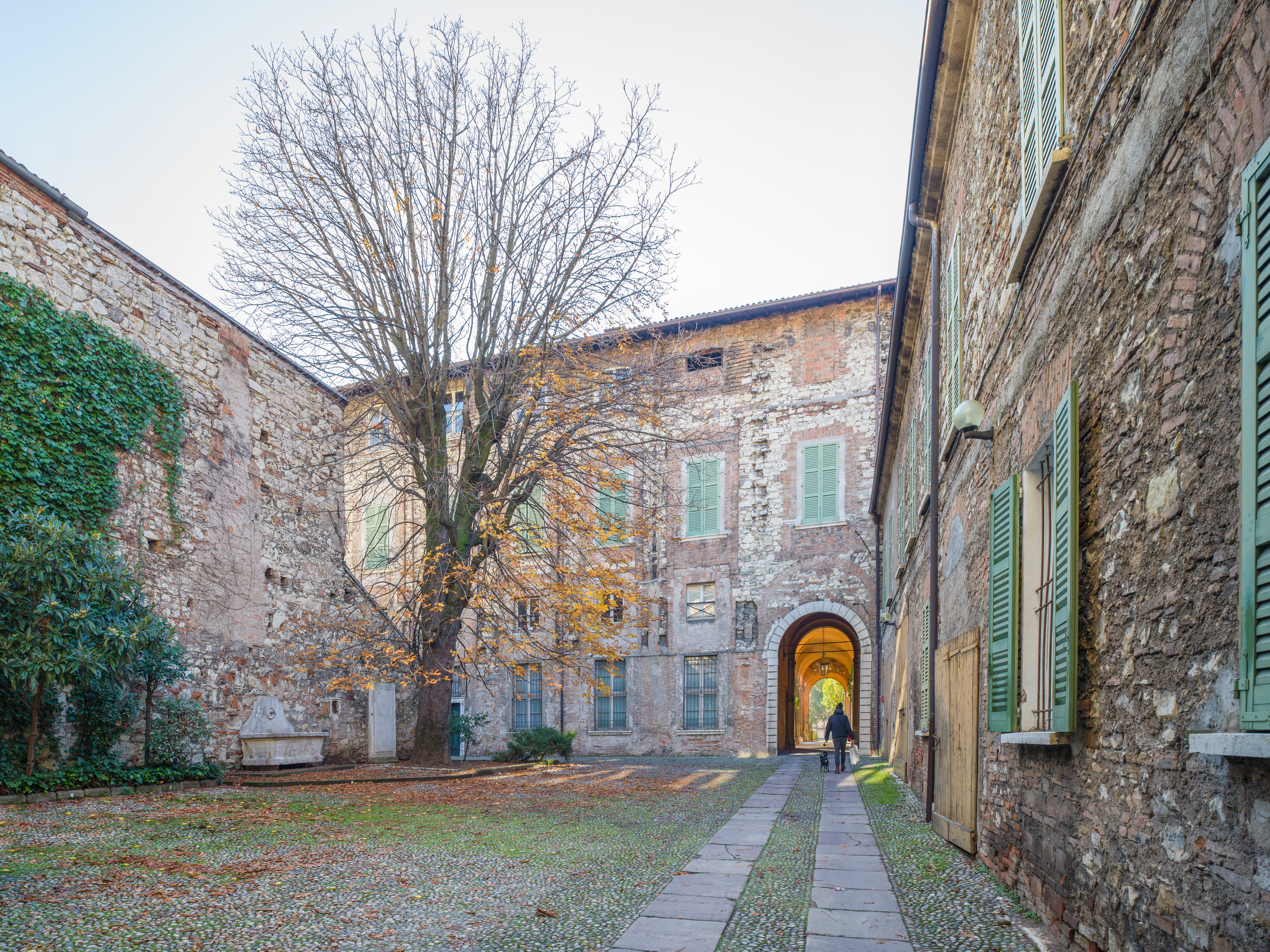
The palace's service courtyard, which is accessed directly from the portal on Moretto Street.

As the construction of Palazzo Averoldi protracted for a long time, it is not easy to reconstruct both the original appearance of the building and the various interventions made over the centuries. Nevertheless, the plan layout of the mansion is a unique case in the panorama of the city's aristocratic residences, since it presents a U-shaped plan, with the front courtyard open to the south. Equally unusual is the fact that the entrance from the north leads directly into the service courtyard, originally equipped with stables, barns and sheds and consisting of rustic masonry; a further unusual element is the lack, in the aristocratic palace itself, of a main facade.

Fausto Lechi states with some certainty that the exterior façade of the mansion, facing Moretto Street, was undoubtedly built as soon as the construction was started, i.e. in 1544. Although unfinished, this facade is asymmetrical and features an ashlar portal of a certain grandeur; it is then adorned simply with two Medusa heads carved in relief, without presenting any other elements worthy of mention. Moving instead from the aforementioned service courtyard, passing through a further entrance hall, one arrives instead in the innermost courtyard of the aristocratic residence, which presents, in this section, a more refined and aristocratic setting.

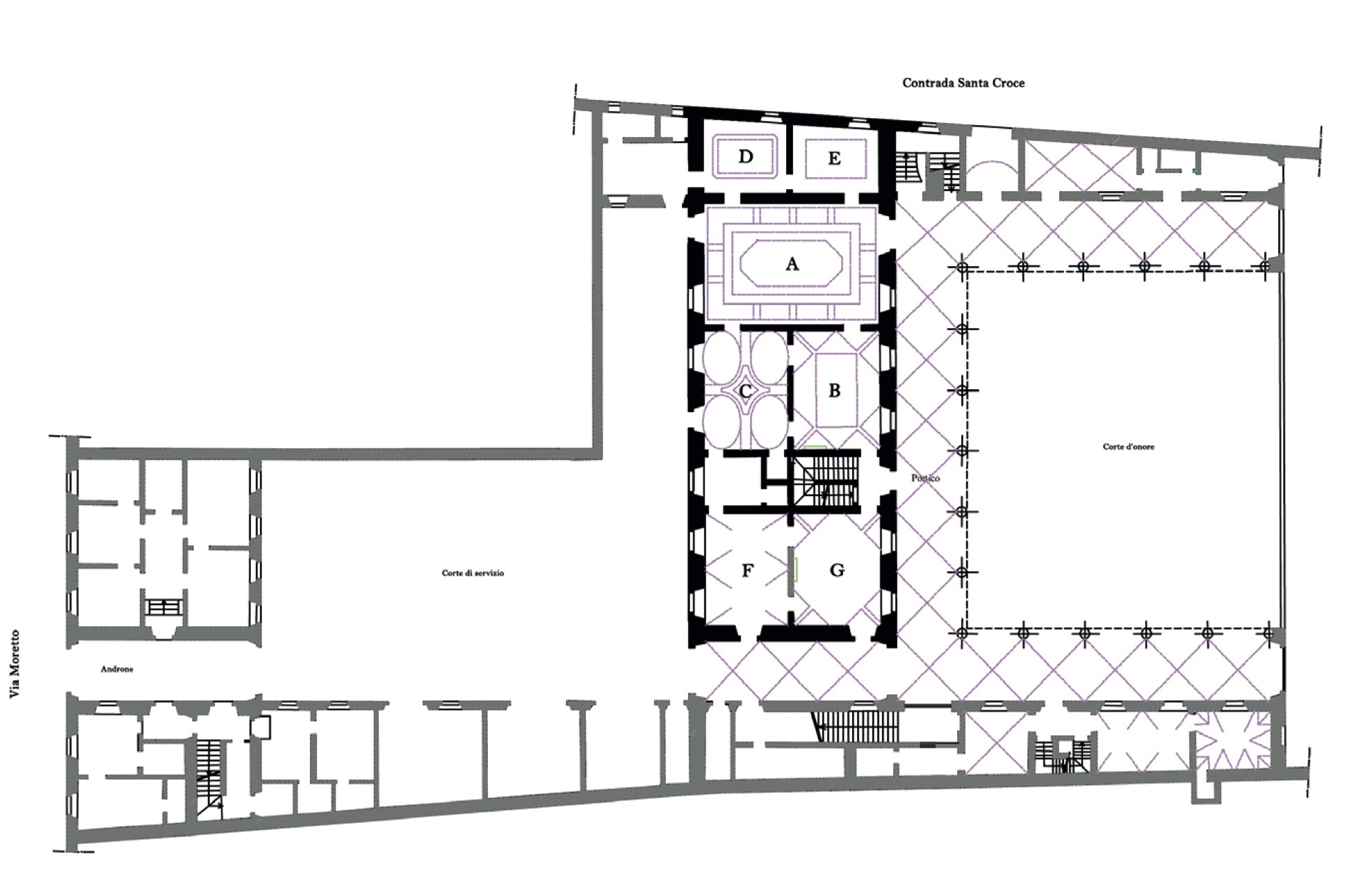
Overall plan of the ground floor of the Averoldi palace, highlighting on the rooms bearing the 16th-century decorations.

The inner courtyard of the palace consists of a portico covered by rib vaults and supported by columns of Tuscan order made of Botticino marble: the same courtyard is then divided into five arcades in the two side arms and six in the central body; in the latter, the even number of bays implies the unusual solution of the fullness of a column on the axis, instead of the emptiness of an arch. The aforementioned columns, moreover, support eyebrowed round arches, while on the upper floor there are Ionic lesenes in which simple windows are inserted; the whole is then concluded by a string course with conspicuous corbels. The architectural layout, on the whole, has been attributed by Fausto Lechi to the work of the Brescian architect Lodovico Beretta, as asserted in numerous other works by local scholars.

Fausto Lechi, analyzing the building's construction, was able to note some anomalies regarding the facade facing Contrada Santa Croce: in this regard, the scholar had speculated that originally the palace presented two levels only in the central part, while the side wings must have had only a porticoed floor. Confirmation of this would seem to be contained in some documents that testify to the construction, by Agostino Avanzo in the mid-seventeenth century, of a "construction department" in the western wing of the palace. Moreover, a photograph taken after the bombing of 1943 reveals the entablature of the central body, in which the holes made to house the ceiling beams can barely be glimpsed. The juxtaposition only later of the building bodies corresponding to the side wings would also explain the corner solution in the upper level of the courtyard, where the pilaster seems as if it were embedded.

=== The 16th-century frescoes of Romanino and Lattanzio Gambara ===
The scholar Fausto Lechi judges it difficult to make a clear distinction between the work of Romanino and that of Lattanzio Gambara: Lechi's hypothesis, in any case, is that the two artists collaborated in a substantially homogeneous and univocal manner. The cooperation of the two Brescian artists, nonetheless, is also found in Palazzo Bargnani and in the convent of Sant'Eufemia, also in Brescia, and in the case of Palazzo Averoldi it is ascertained from seventeenth-century sources, but it has been specified only in recent years: the 16th-century frescoes are datable to the beginning of the sixth decade and adorn the vaults of five small rooms on the ground floor, located in the body of the building that separates the portico from the courtyard behind, which is accessed from Via Moretto. The pictorial cycle revolves around the hall of honor on the vault of which the Chariot of Phaethon is portrayed, which with the optical effect of painting stretches the limits of the ceiling; these same views are inspired by the cycle of frescoes executed by Romanino in the Buonconsiglio Castle in Trento. The work in question, however, is attributed not unreservedly to the hand of Lattanzio Gambara, who seems to have been inspired by the lessons of the Cremonese painter Giulio Campi, with whom he had completed his youthful apprenticeship.

Moving on to the other rooms on the first floor, in a westerly direction, one encounters the Hall of the Seasons and the Hall of Diana's Chariot, respectively. The realization of these fresco cycles should in any case be equally attributed to both Romanino and Lattanzio Gambara, who gave rise to a "linear division of tasks." Critics agree in assigning to Romanino alone the frescoes of the eastern rooms, marked by the figures of Minerva and Abundantia, the viewing of which is hampered by repainting and, in some cases, by gaps in the plasterwork. The side rooms also have a white layer or patina, which in every way precludes an analysis or reading of the underlying decorative apparatus.

=== 18th-century decorations by Giuseppe Teosa and Giuseppe Manfredini ===
Between 1788 and 1796, as mentioned earlier, the second great decorative season of the Averoldi palace began, concerning the noble floor of the building: this same pictorial cycle, which saw the participation of the major artistic figures of eighteenth-century Brescia, represents an important point of transition between eighteenth-century art and, later, the actual neoclassical current. In any case, as is also evident from documents found in the Averoldi Fund, the decorations of the various rooms cost the patrons the considerable sum of 60,905 lire.

==== The "Chinese Room" ====
The so-called Chinese room of the palace, identified in ancient times as the Green Room, (Note: One note, reporting an agreement made in November 1791, states that the restoration "of the boards, which serve as the tapestry to the Green Room fitted to the Chinese one, with figures and trees of gold," had been commissioned.) constitutes a unicum in the Brescia area, especially for its decoration with lacquered wooden panels of oriental themes, made with a green background and figures in ochre. At a first observation it appears, on the whole, to be apparently homogeneous; moreover, it is composed of a boiserie and four over-door paintings, a wooden false ceiling composed of paintings on panel and on canvas, culminating in a frieze with grotesque motifs. This complex decorative apparatus has been attributed by critics to the hand of Manfredini and Teosa with some certainty, who consider the lacquer components of the boiserie to be Chinese originals, and, specifically, attribute the surmounting doors and the central medallion of the vault alternately to Manfredini (Tanzi) or Teosa (Cretella). More in-depth archival research conducted by Pietro Balzani for the drafting of his dissertation (proposed in the bibliography) has revealed some significant elements that show how the current appearance of the hall is the result of chronologically distinct interventions attributable to different artistic personalities.

== See also ==
- Romanino
- Lattanzio Gambara
- Ludovico Beretta

== Bibliography ==
- Filippo Piazza (2016). Filippo Piazza, Enrico Valseriati (ed.). Brescia nel secondo Cinquecento, Architettura, arte e società (PDF). schede a cura di Irene Giustina e Elisa Sala. Brescia: Morcelliana. pp. 297–299.
- Camillo Boselli (1972). "Asterischi bresciani: la decorazione settecentesca di Palazzo Averoldi in contrada S. Croce in Brescia". Arte Lombarda. 17 (37). Vita e Pensiero: 96–139. ISSN 0004-3443. JSTOR 43104924.
- Stefania Cretella (December 2016). "La grande stagione neoclassica a Brescia: il rinnovamento di palazzo Averoldi". Ricche Minere (6). Venezia: 121–144. ISSN 2284-1717.
- Fausto Lechi (1975). 3: Il Cinquecento nella città. Vol. III. Brescia: Edizioni di Storia bresciana. pp. 312–330.
- Bettoni, Barbara (2010). I beni dell'agiatezza. Stili di vita nelle famiglie bresciane dell'età moderna. Milano: Franco Angeli. pp. 45–124. ISBN 978-88-464-6868-0.
- Paolo Brognoli (1826). Nuova guida per la città di Brescia opera di Paolo Brognoli. Brescia: presso Federico Nicoli-Cristiani tipografo nel palazzo Avogadro a S. Alessandro. pp. 201–202.
- Pietro Balzani, Elisa Bassini, ed. (2020). Palazzo Averoldi: arte e storia di una nobile dimora bresciana. Milano: Scalpendi.
- Francesco Frangi (2007). "L'ultimo Romanino (e il primo Gambara)". L'ultimo Romanino: ricerche sulle opere tarde del pittore bresciano. Cinisello Balsamo: Silvana. pp. 17–39.
- Stefania Cretella (2020). "Palazzo Averoldi". In Stefania Cretella (ed.). Miti e altre storie: la grande decorazione a Brescia 1680-1830. Grafo. pp. 99–102.
- Fappani, Antonio, ed. (1982). "Palazzi della città". Enciclopedia Bresciana. 11. Brescia: La Voce del Popolo. OCLC 163181589.
- Francesco De Leonardis, ed. (2018). Guida di Brescia, La storia, l'arte, il volto della città. Brescia: Grafo. OCLC 1124648622.
