= Piazza della Loggia =

Square in Brescia, Italy

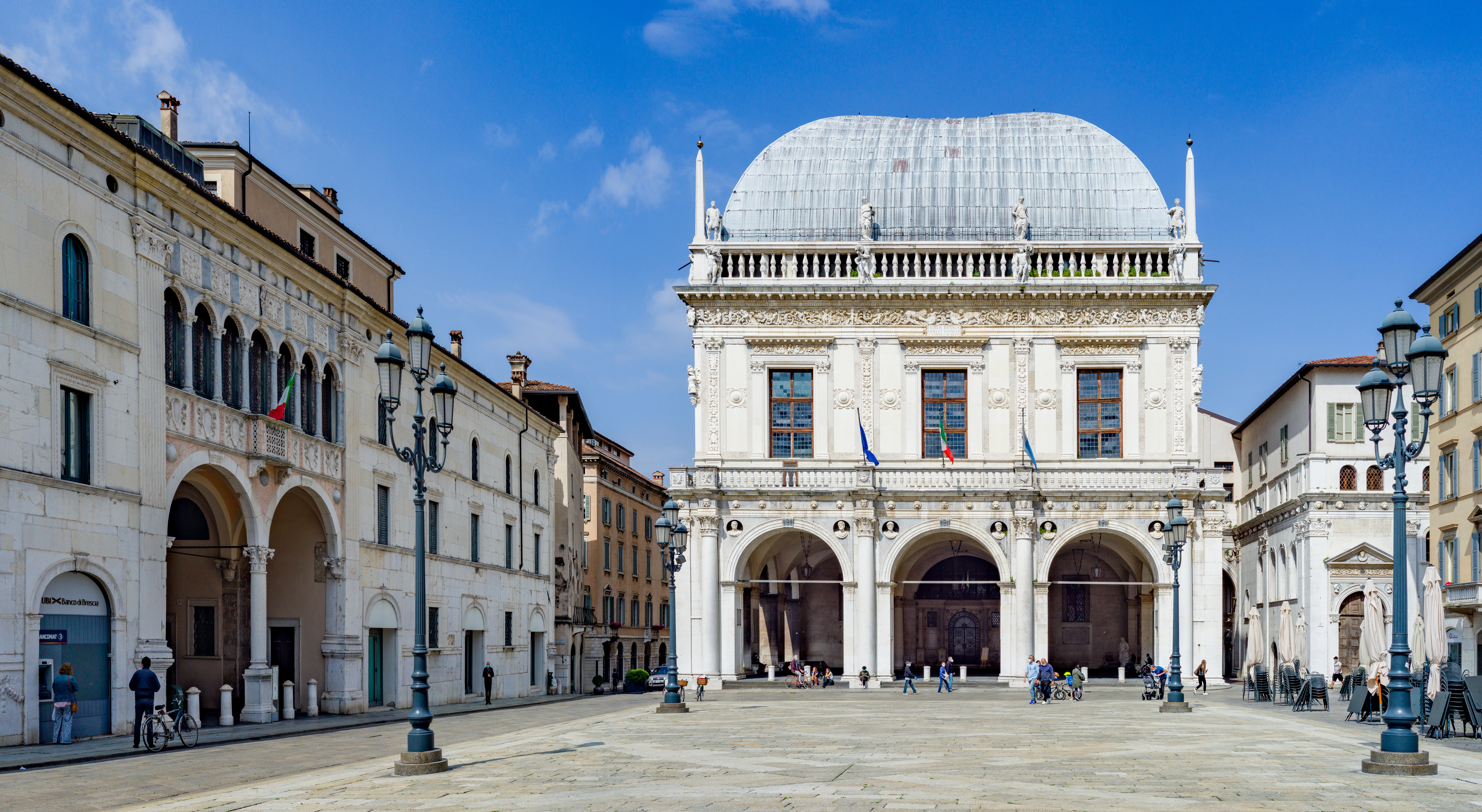
- View of the square with the Palazzo della Loggia in the foreground and the Old Mount of Piety on the left
- Interactive map of Piazza della Loggia
- Former names: Piazza Grande or Nuova; Piazza Vecchia; Piazza del Comune
- Type: Pedestrian area
- Location: Brescia, Italy
- Quarter: Brescia Antica
- Postal code: 25121
- Coordinates: 45°32′23″N 10°13′11″E

Piazza della Loggia, or more simply Piazza Loggia, also known as Piazza Grande or Piazza Vecchia (Piàsa dela Lògia or Piàsa ècia in Brescian dialect), is one of the Italian city Brescia's main squares, a symbolic place of the Brescian Renaissance and Venetian rule over Brescia.

Designed and built in a unified manner since the fifteenth century, it has an overall rectangular shape and is bordered along its perimeter by a series of historic buildings of a certain artistic interest. On the western side can be seen the 16th-century Palazzo della Loggia, seat of Brescia's municipal council, and on the southern side the two mounts of piety, the old and the new, which, built between the 15th and 16th centuries, constitute Italy's first lapidary museum. On the eastern side of the square, on the other hand, there are the Renaissance arcades and the tower with the 16th-century astronomical clock. In the northeastern section of the square, however, worthy of mention are the Bella Italia monument, donated to the city by Victor Emmanuel II in memory of the Ten Days of Brescia, and Porta Bruciata, a defensive gateway dating back to the Roman-era circle of walls.

On 28 May 1974, during an anti-fascist demonstration of trade unions and workers, the square was the scene of a neo-fascist terrorist attack that left eight people dead and about 100 wounded.

== History ==
=== The creation of the “Platea Magna” ===
In the 15th century, Brescia was in fact a city without a public square, since there was no functional space for public gatherings. The image that emerged of the Lombard capital was therefore "deformed and disordered", and the inauguration of a new square "was intended to constitute both the seat of the Venetian government and the new urban center".

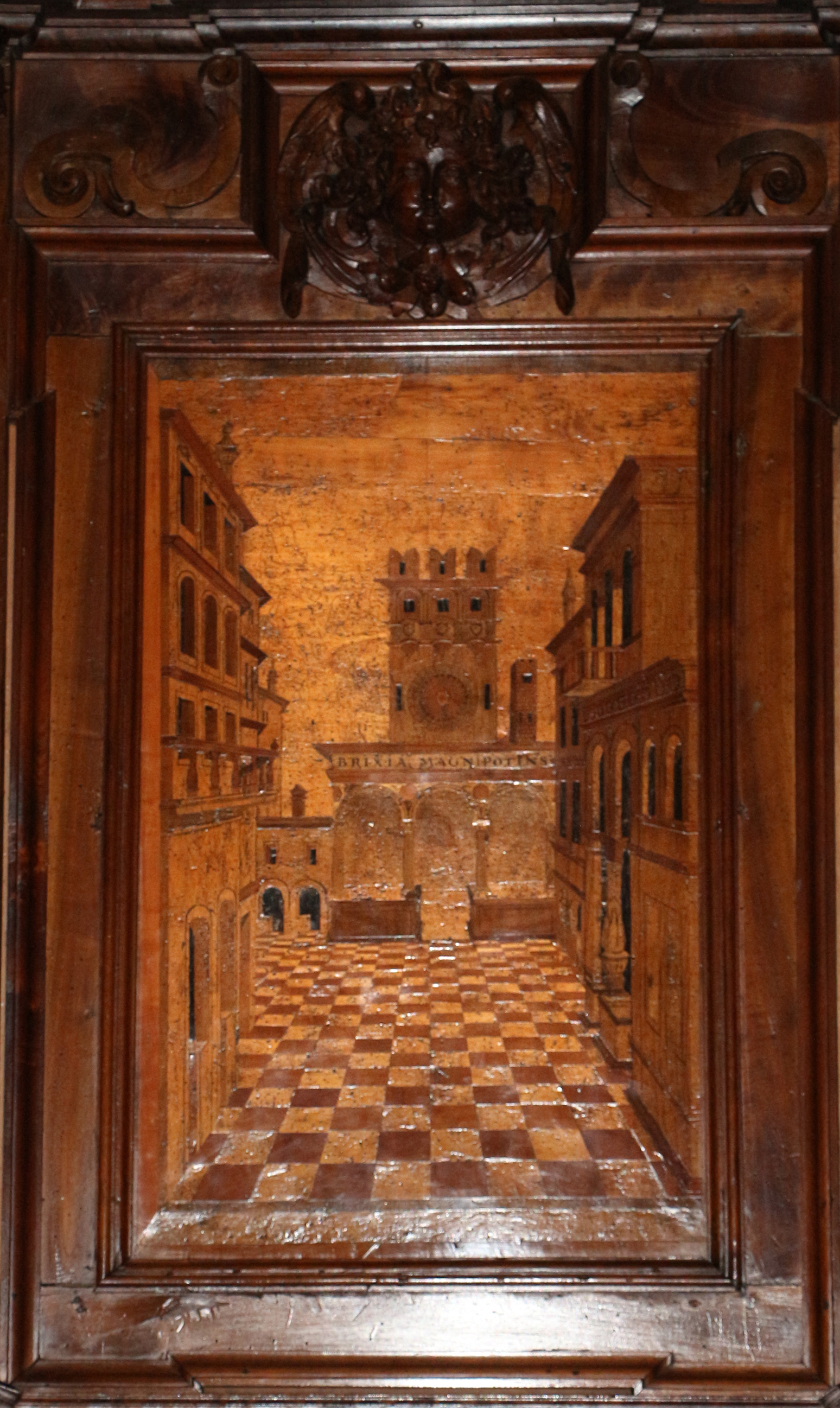
Piazza della Loggia depicted in a wooden inlay, preserved in the choir of the church of Santi Bartolomeo e Stefano in Bergamo.

An early development of Piazza della Loggia was thus promoted on the basis of these premises. The work, not surprisingly, was encouraged by the Venetian podestà Marco Foscari, brother of the then Doge Francesco. It was thanks to the intervention of the aforementioned Marco Foscari that, during 1433, the city's grand council unanimously voted a measure aimed at the demolition of shacks and hovels, owned by the municipality, that were located next to the modern square: (Note: Marco Foscari supports this urban intervention by, among other things, reiterating that a "multum famosa et magnifica civitas ” such as Brescia needed a public square, thus replacing the previous cluttered hovels and dwellings. For further discussion, see Bowd (2010, pp. 87–88.)) at that time, in fact, there was only the small clearing outside Porta Bruciata, near the church of San Giuseppe, which was considered too small and, precisely, unsuitable for hosting events of a public nature.

=== The first Loggia and civic buildings ===
After clearing the space previously occupied by alleys and hovels, the city authorities proceeded by endowing the square with new buildings, among which a loggia, modelled after other Italian cities, would be primary in importance. A first loggia structure was erected in 1436, based on the design of the ducal architect Niccolò Lupo. This first palace had exterior frescoes depicting the Brescian bishops Philastrius and Apollonius, created by the painter Alessandro d'Ardesio. The structure, moreover, was crowned with a statue depicting St. Mark, an obvious tribute to the lordship of the Serenissima.

Having finished the western portion of the square with the erection of the aforementioned loggia, they proceeded by erecting in 1437, this time on the eastern side, a first turret equipped with a clock. It again consisted of a loggia structure designed by architect Lodovico Beretta, designed so that it rested directly on the fortified walls of the New Citadel. Later a first clock, placed on the same turret, was completed in 1447 and decorated not only with the coats of arms of the rulers and the city, but also with two statues sculpted by Andriolo Vigevano depicting Mary and the archangel Gabriel. The same clock face was probably modified when the eastern porticoes of the square were built, as testified by a wooden inlay in the choir of the Church of Saints Bartholomew and Stephen in Bergamo, which is useful for tracing at least a partial reconstruction of the 15th century core of the Brescian square.

=== The southern side of the square and the first Italian lapidary museum ===
The city council, after decorating the west and east sides, therefore decided to erect in 1465 a wall of carved stones in the southern portion of the square, so that it would serve as a support to erect an eventual palace there in the future. However, two unexpected events prompted the municipal authorities to change what had been previously planned: in carrying out the demolition work on the houses in that portion of the square, (Note: The work in question, among other things, also involved the then home of the grammarian Gabriele di Concoreggio, and had the ultimate purpose of storing salt deposits there. For further discussion, see Zamboni (1778, pp. 28–29.)) “certain beautiful ancient stones with epitaphs and beautiful ancient writings,” that is, marbles and epigraphs from the Roman age, as reported by the chronicler Iacopo Melga in his chronicle, were found underground. Another factor of some importance was the burning, in the same area, of some huts and woodworking shops, which caught fire as a result of the celebrations desired by the population for the peace of Bagnolo in 1484.

In light of these events, the general council of the Municipality of Brescia, assisted by the superintendence of the deputies for public buildings Marco Ducco and Tommaso Baiguera, resolved that, between 1484 and 1485, all the classical epigraphs, found in the area of the prisons and Porta Paganora, should be precisely included in the building that was being constructed in the southern part of the large square. Thus was created the so-called Lapidarium, as well as the first lapidary museum in Italy. In this same building, then, a few years later, the Old Mount of Piety would be established, built permanently between 1484 and 1489 by Filippo Grassi in elegant Venetian forms.

An overview of the Old Mount of Piety

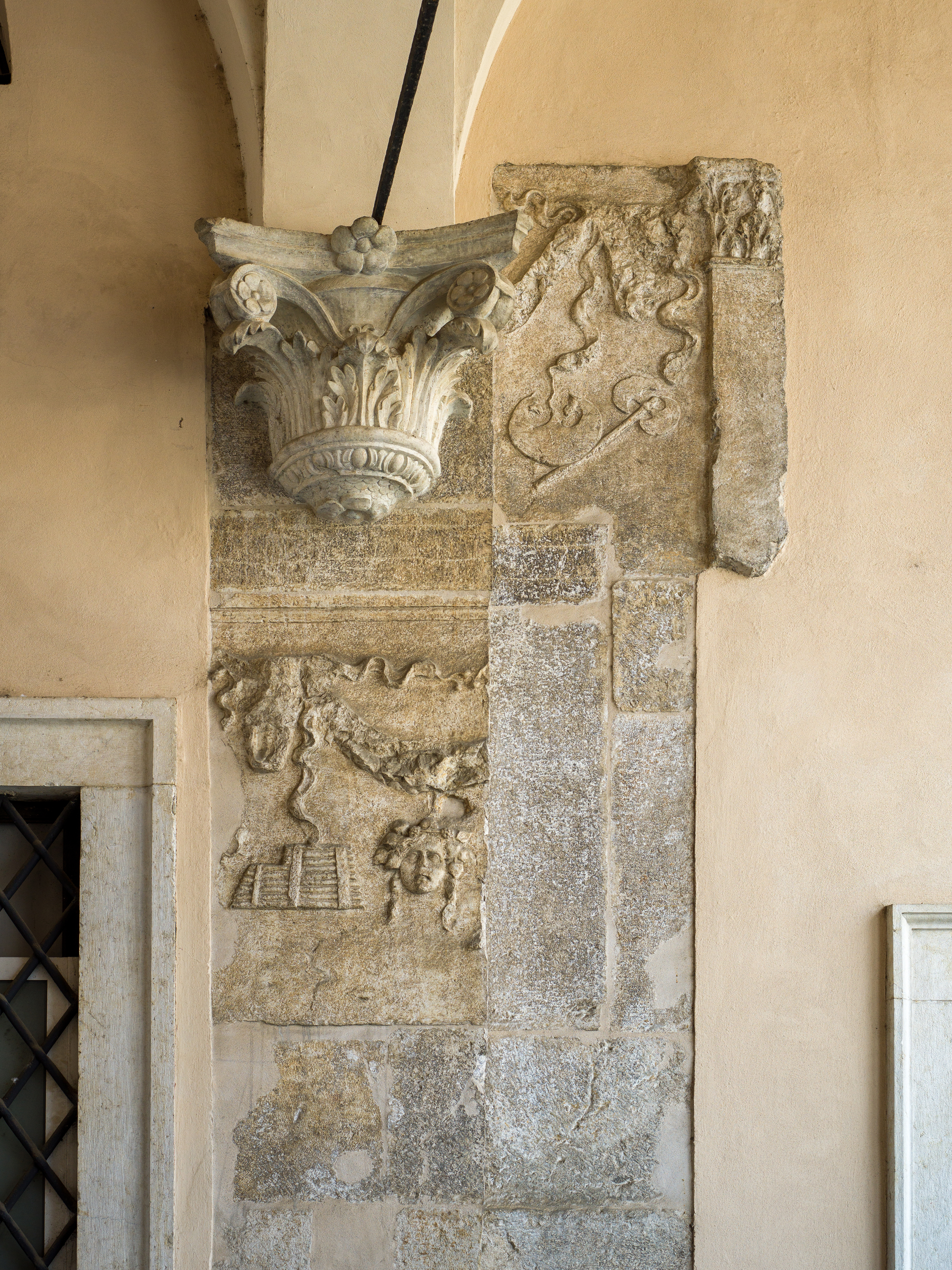
Detail of stone fragments from the Roman period

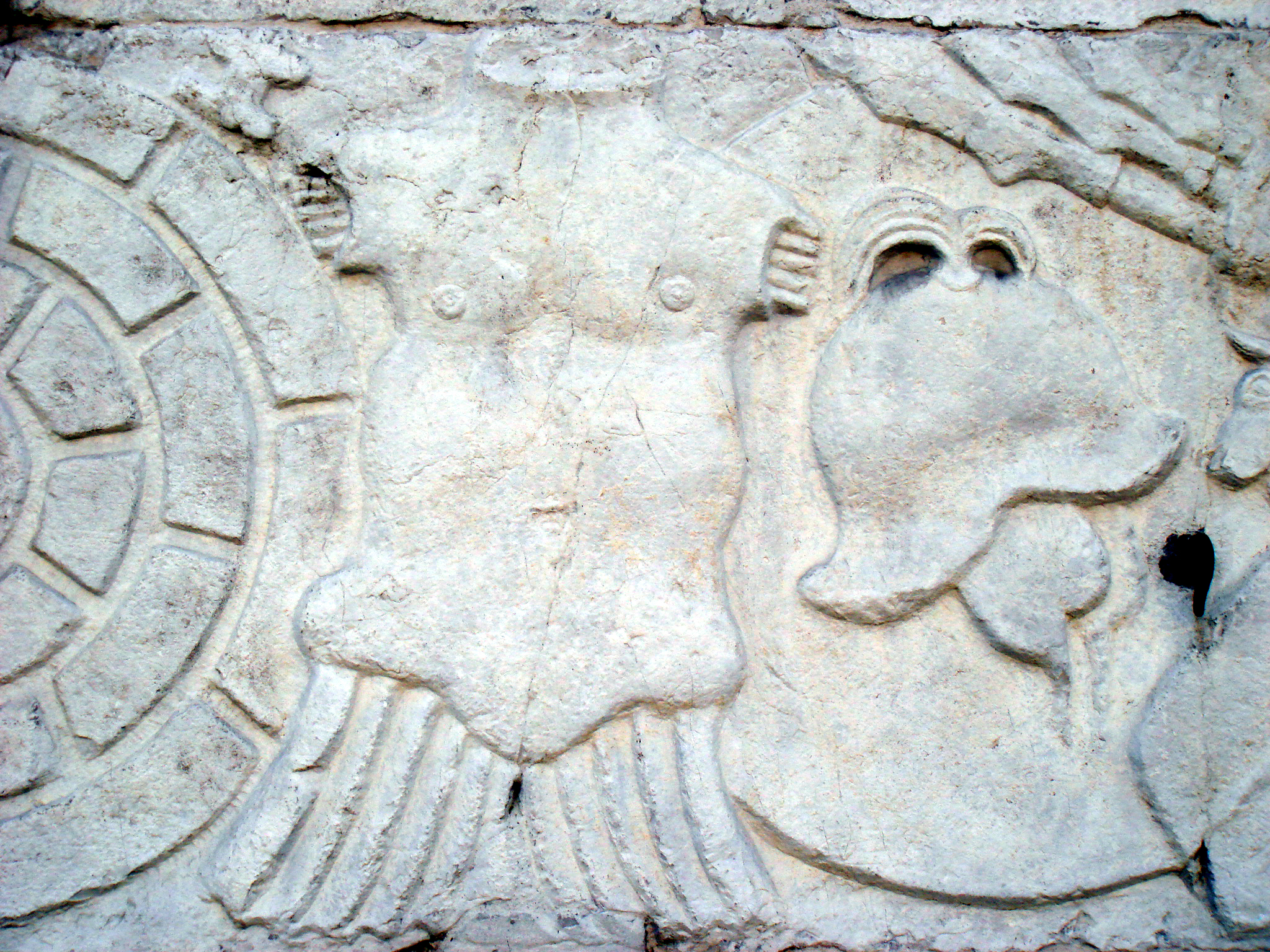
Roman tombstone on the facade of the Mount of Piety

These arrangements should be understood not only from a practical point of view, i.e., for the purpose of reuse of stone materials found on site, but primarily and above all by virtue of a certain humanistic sensibility, which at the time was precisely established in Brescia: as the scholar Theodor Mommsen had the opportunity to observe, this lapidary museum was much desired by a number of Brescian intellectuals and humanists, who had a marked sensitivity to the classical age and the Roman past of the city, so much so that Roman inscriptions and epigraphs were placed on the walls of the buildings erected, not coincidentally at the level of the observer. Further evidence of this cultural climate is the fact that the humanist Michele Ferrarino, in 1486, defined the Renaissance square with the Latin Forum and the loggia building as a basilica. (Note: It is no coincidence, in fact, that Andrea Palladio described the public palace in Brescia, in his Quattro Libri, as a “basilica of our times”. Cf. Andrea Palladio, I quattro libri dell’architettura, appresso Dominico de’ Franceschi, Venezia 1570, book III, p. 42.)

=== The new palace of the Loggia ===
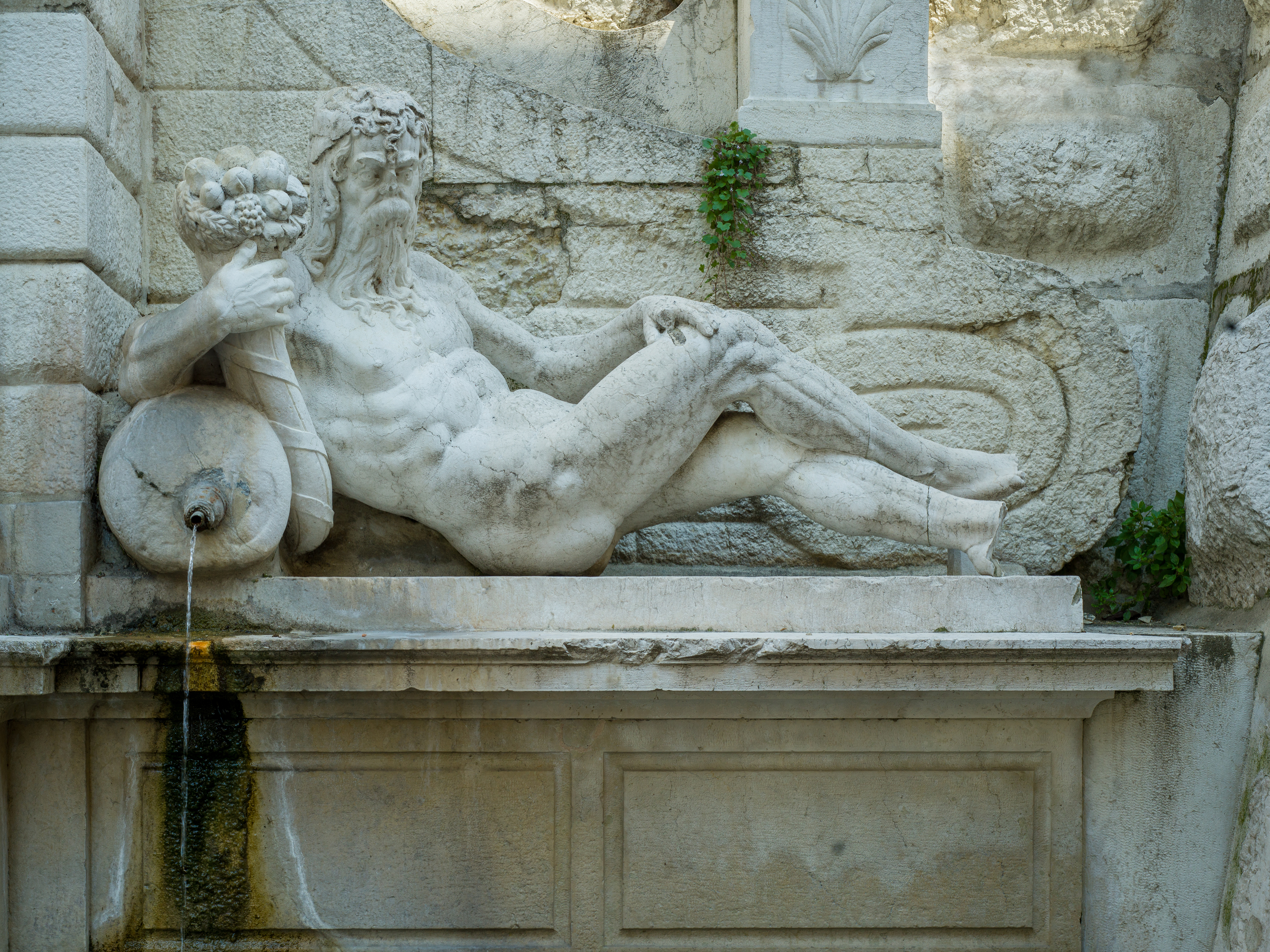
Allegory of the Garza River with a cornucopia, part of the sculptural group of the fountain in the Pallata Tower. The river basin used to flow where the foundations of the 16th-century Palazzo della Loggia were later built.

As early as the 1560s, there was a need for the city authorities to meet in a room of sufficient size and splendour to accommodate the offices that would be housed there. For this reason, on 8 July 1467, it was decided to build a room over the existing loggia and over the Garza River: this room, used by the various councils, housed the chancellery, the treasury, and the tax office.

Work began that, according to the plans of the ducal engineer and other technicians and architects, would later lead to the laying of some stones on the bed of the Garza River so that a much larger building could be built and stabilized above it. It was not until 1489, however, that the earlier decision to build it on the west side of the square and over the Garza itself was reaffirmed. In fact, between 1491 and 1492, the pre-existing loggia was completely demolished in order to construct a new building for the civic magistrates: it is not known whether the materials of the pre-existing building were reused, although it is still evident that the Renaissance loggia that was built was devoid of 15th-century decorative elements. At this point, the deputies wanted to carefully select, among the various projects submitted, the one that was considered the most suitable for the palace: among the ancient sources, the scholar Baldassare Zamboni, in the eighteenth century, hypothesized that the design of the loggia built could be attributed to Bramante.

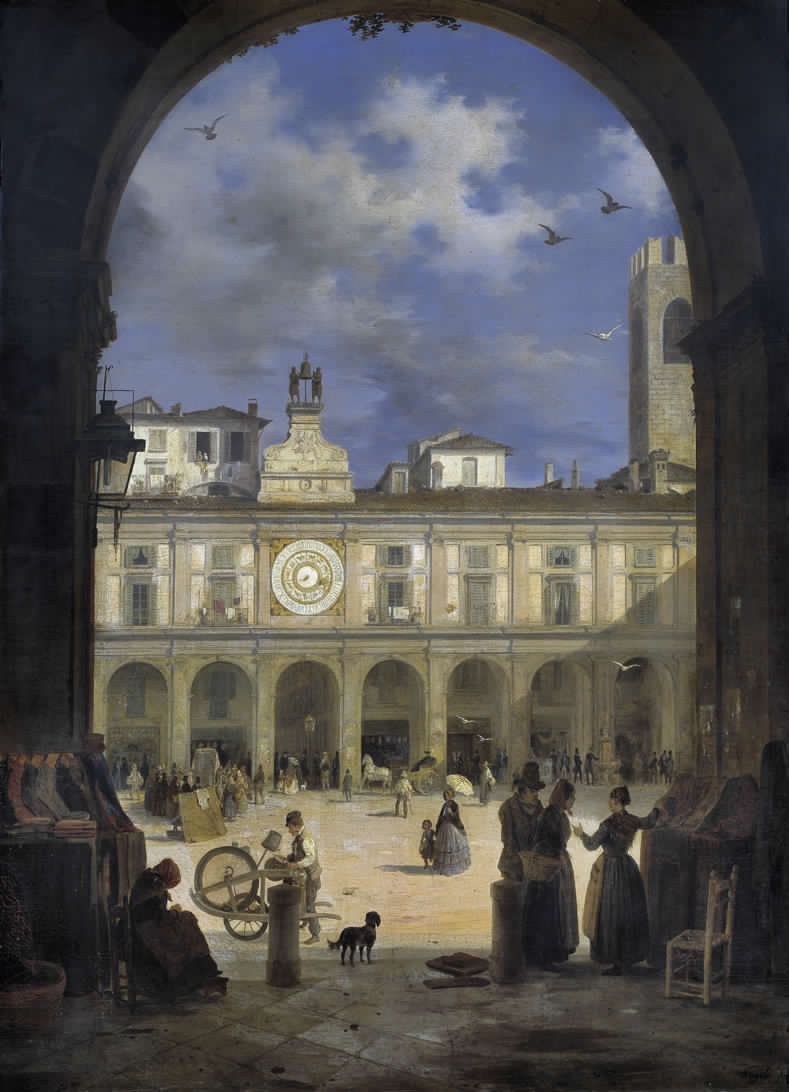
An overall view of the eastern porticoes of Piazza della Loggia in a 19th-century painting by painter Angelo Inganni.

The first project for the palace was to consist of a wooden model presented by the architect Tommaso Formenton: Formenton himself was inclined to come to the city in person to illustrate more clearly his ideas about the location of the public palace. On 6 November 1489, it was agreed that the model would be taken from Vicenza to Brescia: Formenton took care of bringing the wooden model himself, transporting it from Vicenza in a cart drawn by four horses and accompanied by a foot soldier and a helper.

The beginning of the construction works was inaugurated during a solemn public event organized specifically to celebrate the construction of the Palace: in the presence of the then Bishop of Brescia, Paolo Zane, as well as many members of the clergy, municipal authorities, magistrates and a large number of citizens, the first stone was laid and then blessed by the Bishop himself on 5 March 1492, according to the chronicler Elia Capriolo:

Paolo Zane, our Bishop, accompanied by a large number of clergy and people, as well as the magistrates of the city, laid the first stone of the foundation on 5 March 1492.

— Patrizio Spini, Il suplimento delle Historie bresciane, c. 239.

The first phase of the construction of the palace was completed around 1510, when Brescia was under French rule, although the works had been suspended since 1508, the year in which the League of Cambrai was founded. At that time, however, the lower part of the palace, begun in March 1492 and completed at the beginning of 1504, had been completed; the sculptural decoration of this part, on the other hand, was carried out between the summer of 1493 and the spring of 1506.

=== The transformation of the square and the palace after the sack of Brescia ===
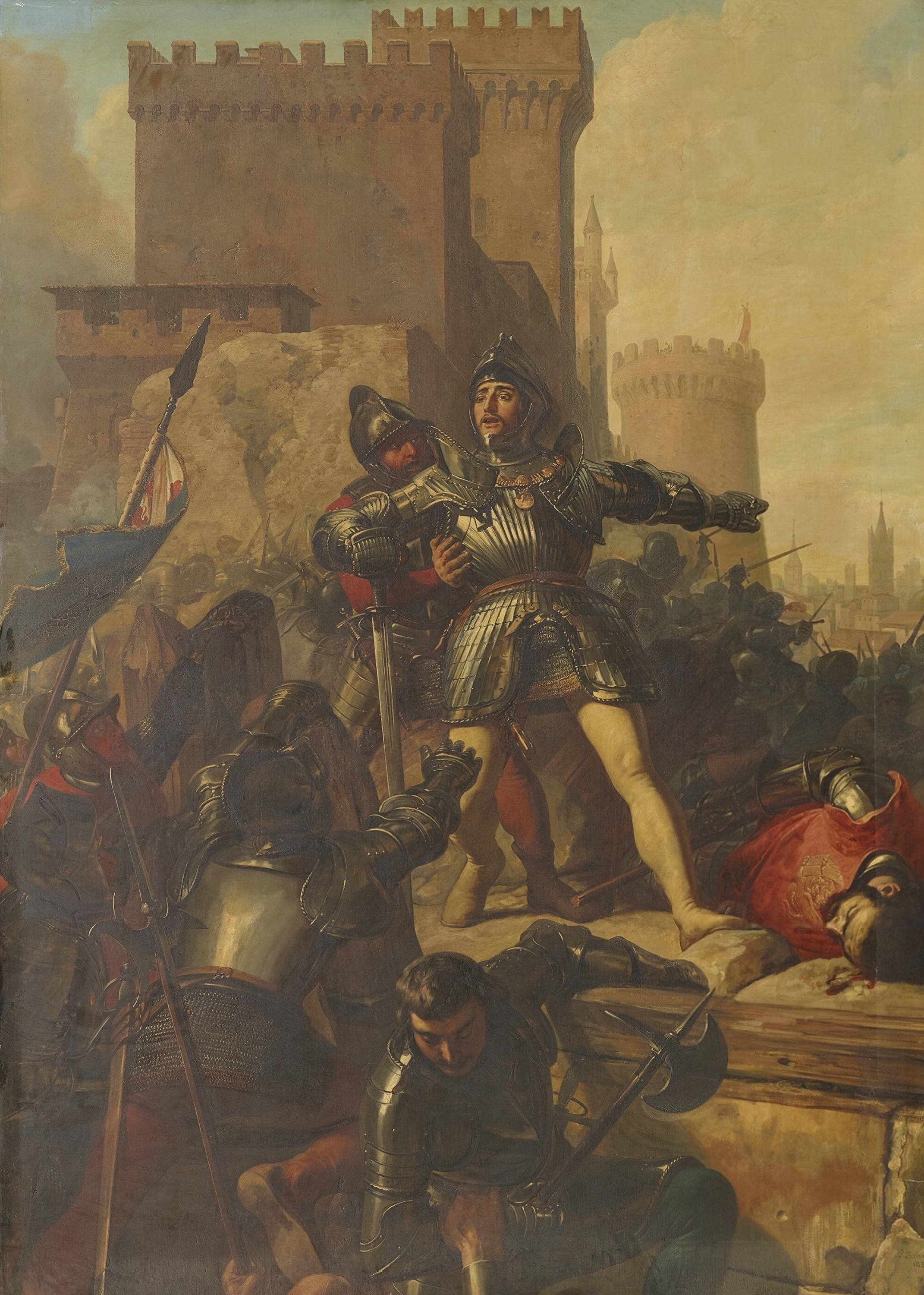
Charles-Philippe Larivière, Taking of Brescia, 1836–1837. Oil painting, 387×274 cm.

The construction phases of the Palazzo della Loggia are very complex and linked to the historical and political events of the time. It is no coincidence that, at the end of the first decade of the century, the political climate in Europe became increasingly tense: the events of the War of the League of Cambrai were imminent, and the first French incursions into Brescia can be interpreted as a sign of a process that was coming to an end. In a few years, the sack of Brescia in 1512 by French troops under the command of Gaston of Foix would not only devastate the city, but also destroy the myth of the so-called Brixia magnipotens. (Note: On the myth of Brixia magnipotens see Zani (2010, pp. 24–25.) with relevant notes to the text, bibliography and documentation cited.) The great Renaissance construction sites of the city came to a halt, including that of the Palazzo della Loggia, which still had, at the base of the scaffolding, many reliefs by Gasparo Cairano ready to be installed on the fronts of the second floor, including the two angular trophies, which remained there for a period of fifty years, waiting for the resumption of work under the direction of Lodovico Beretta, precisely in 1549–1550. The city's priorities changed radically, from artistic and cultural splendour to the recovery of basic vital functions; the building of the Loggia was not completed until 1574, almost a century after the start of construction.

=== Resumption of the construction of the Loggia and other works on the square ===
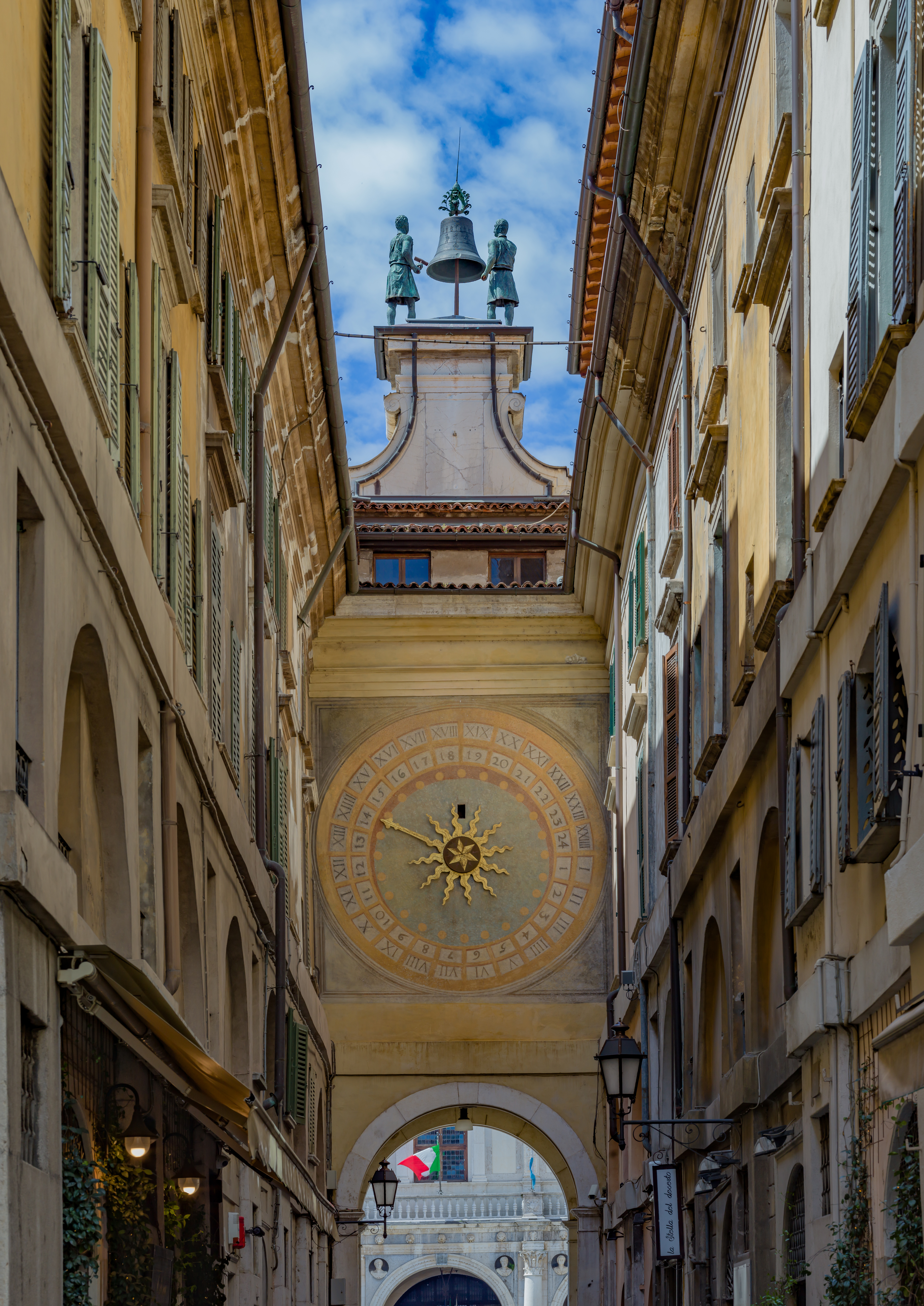
The southern side of the Clock Tower and below, the passage opened in the middle of the 16th century by Lodovico Beretta during the works on the eastern side of the square.

Towards the end of the second half of the 16th century, the Brescian city authorities strongly promoted the resumption of the construction of the Palazzo della Loggia, which had been halted for several years due to the vicissitudes of war and political events. On this occasion, the advice of the architect Andrea Palladio was sought, who visited Brescia four times between 1550, 1562, 1567 and 1575. Despite important consultations with Jacopo Sansovino, Galeazzo Alessi, Giovanni Antonio Rusconi, and Titian, the supervision of the work was entrusted to the Brescian architect Lodovico Beretta, who had been employed by the civic authorities as municipal architect since 1550.

This new architectural and constructive impulse also materialized for the eastern side of the square, perhaps the least organized until then, due to the proximity of the walls of the new citadel: the importance of this part of the square was confirmed over time with the construction of the Astronomical Clock Tower, the annexed Loggia and the open passage, in the walls of the citadel, of a gate connecting the new square to the building of the Broletto, the residence of the Captain General of Brescia.

The first change in the eastern side of the square in this sense was the donation made by the Venetian authorities to the citizens of Brescia in 1517, which in fact deprived the New Citadel of its military function and turned it into a public asset: This led to the demilitarization of the area of Porta Bruciata and the adjacent drawbridge, with the consequent dismissal of the castellan of the same gate in 1531; later, in the same area, several shophouses were built and architectural interventions such as the construction of stone portals on the face of Porta Bruciata were promoted. The most important interventions, however, took place in the 1640s, when this part of the square also underwent a major transformation, redefining the side facing the Palazzo della Loggia.

==== The opening of the Strada Nova, the eastern arcades and the tower with the astronomical clock ====
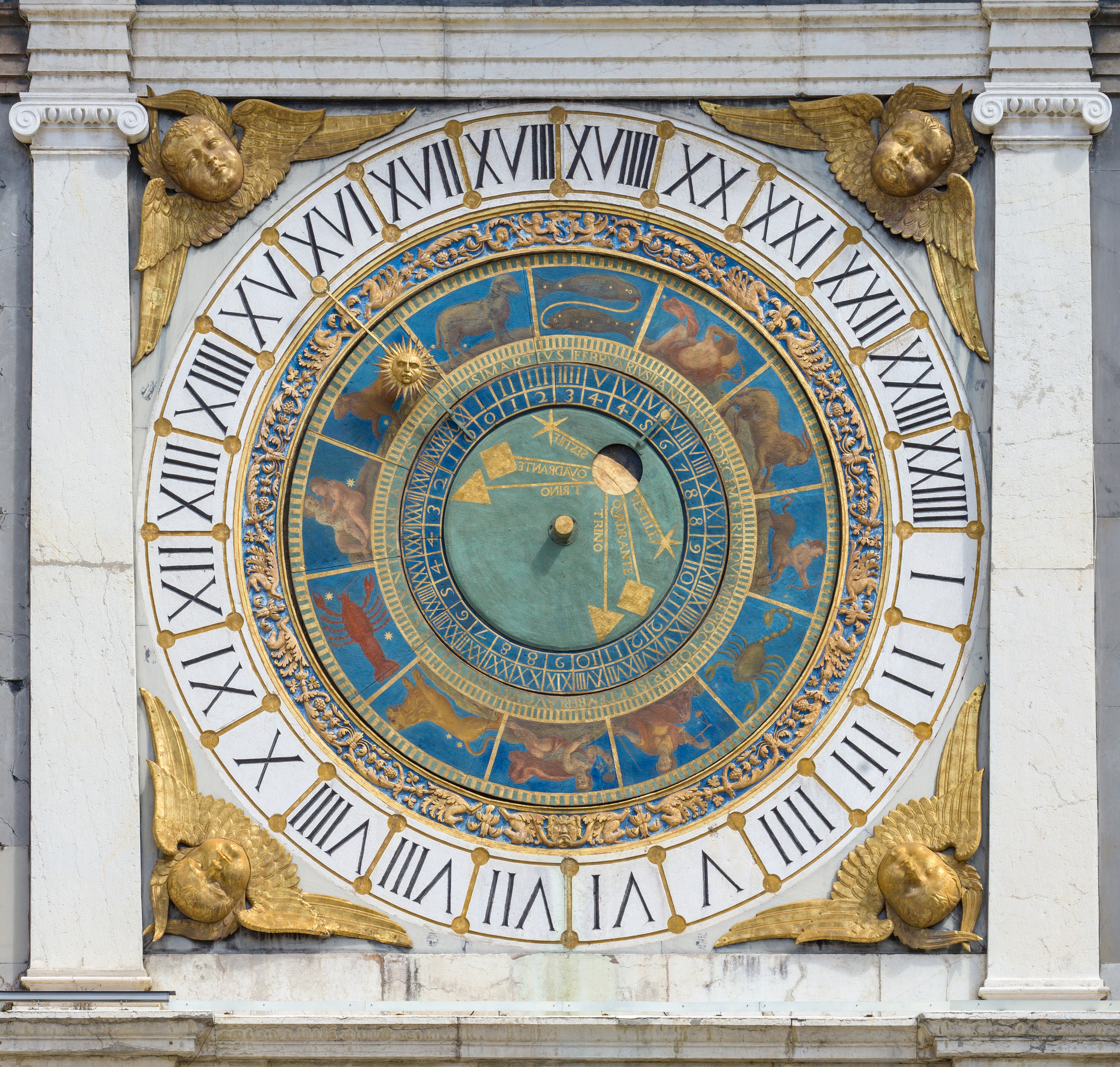
A detail of the astronomical dial made in 1546.

In general, the documents mention Lodovico Beretta's intervention only for the opening of the Strada Nuova, even if scholars agree that this phase was entirely designed and conceived by Beretta himself. Between 1540 and 1546, fifteen wood workshops along the walls of the citadel were replaced by ten brick workshops; in 1547, another five wood workshops were demolished, again for the same reason, to enlarge the square. On the occasion of these demolitions, the Brescian magistrates also wanted to build a new astronomical clock, and in December 1543, they decided to start the construction, entrusting the internal mechanism to the craftsman Paolo Gennari from Rezzato. The work on the clock was completed in 1546, along with the construction of the porticoes and arches surrounding the Renaissance clock tower: in 1548, "the arcades, all of them collonaded in a certain way" were built to protect the shops. These same porticoes, completed between 1595 and 1601 by Pier Maria Bagnadore, are characterized by a certain uniformity and bichromy of the marble between the grey color of the upper part and the pendentives of the lower order; the extension of the porticoes to Porta Bruciata created a Mannerist perspective and a break with the symmetry originally conceived, since the Clock Tower was placed exactly in the center, with four bays to the left and as many to the right.

In 1544, the civic authorities decided to open an entrance to the new street, which, in addition to continuing the central axis of the square, would create an important link with Piazza del Duomo and the Broletto; the original plan called for the new passageway to have seven shophouses on each side, in addition to being an important communication artery between the two squares from a military point of view. Despite the reasons given for the opening of the street, the permission from the Venetian authorities was not granted until January 1550, with the construction sites opened in 1551 and completed in 1553. Work on the construction of the shophouses began in 1551, to be put up for auction in November 1552.

==== The works on the southern side: the two Mounts of Piety ====
A view of the south side of the square with the New Mount of Piety building in the foreground.

It was also at this time that the need arose to intervene in the southern buildings of the square, in particular in the structure of the Old Mount of Piety, which had been built in an earlier period: for the first time, the General Council drew up a plan to extend the Mount of Piety to the east of this part of the square, with the subsequent creation, in 1553, of the "New" or "Great" Mount, a new aid institution with a clear banking character, intended to curb the practice of usury that was widespread among the population at the time. However, for political and moral reasons, it did not begin operating until 1587, and a suitable site was not found until 1595. The bureaucratic paperwork for the construction of the new Mount of Piety followed, with the creation of two separate administrations for the respective Brescian Mounts of Piety: the initial hypothesis of building the new Mount of Piety in the small square to the north and on the column with the Lion of St. Mark was abandoned, and the final location was on the southern side, next to the pre-existing fifteenth-century Mount of Piety. Finally, in December 1598, the architect Pier Maria Bagnadore presented a new design for the new building, which, after being unanimously approved by the public deputies, was first made into a wooden model for better study: once the overall design was approved, Bagnadore directed the work and the whole thing was completed in 1601, as the inscription carved above the entrance portal indicates.

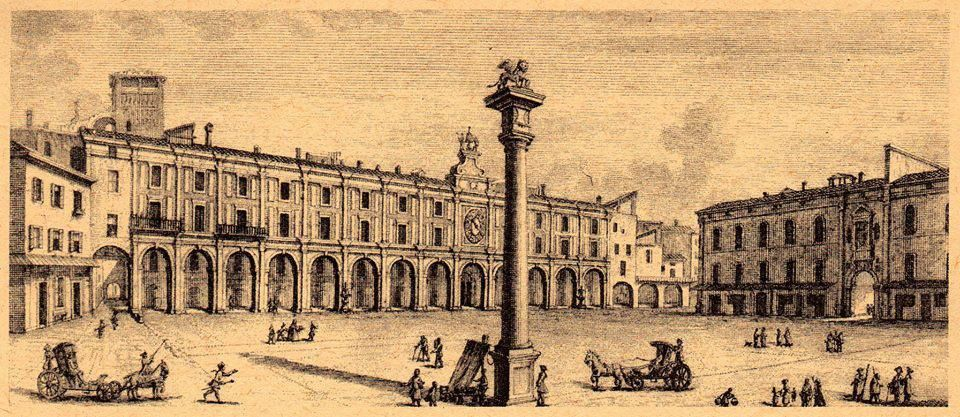
An eighteenth-century miniature of Piazza della Loggia and in particular of the eastern side of the square: in the foreground, the column with St. Mark's lion, later torn down and replaced by the Bella Italia statue.

In the early years of the 17th century, with the construction of the aforementioned arcades on the eastern side and the new Mount of Piety on the southern side, the square began to take on the appearance that would characterize it for centuries to come. The only side that remained untouched by these great "monumentalization" projects was the northern side: besides the purely economic aspects of saving the civic magistracies, this part of the square was actually intended as a visual respite, also to allow some artisans to exercise their services, at least on this part of the platea magna; in any case, the three buildings visible in this northern part were all unified and embellished at the end of the 19th century, so that they too would be in harmony with the overall ambience of the Renaissance square.

On the north-eastern side of the square stands the Monument to the Beautiful Italy, erected in 1864 by the sculptor Giovanni Battista Lombardi to replace the Venetian column with the Lion of St. Mark on top, which had been demolished by revolutionaries in 1797.

=== The 1974 bombing ===
In addition to its architectural beauty and central role in the life of the city, the square became infamous for the massacre that killed 8 people and injured 102 others during an anti-fascist demonstration on 28 May 1974.

== The “talking statues” ==
In the square, there are three of the four so-called "talking statues" of Brescia, (Note: In contrast, the fourth statue, Mostasù dèle Cosére, is located along Corso Mameli.) a group of sculptures from different periods on which the Brescians used to post anonymous messages criticizing the rulers. In particular, under the portico of the Palazzo della Loggia, there is the Lodoìga, a sculpture dating from the second half of the 16th century. This statue, placed in direct contact with the square, was considered by the citizens of Brescia as a "spokesman" for the grievances of the people, who expressed their criticism through notes and sheets anonymously pasted on the statue or on the wall adjacent to it. Counterbalancing the Lodoiga were the two macc dèle ure ("the madmen of the hours"), called Tone and Batista, placed at the top of the Clock Tower. Because of their location, towering over the square, they were considered to be the patrons of the city government, in open contrast to the Lodoiga.

== Image gallery ==
The arcades located along the east side of the square

Palazzo della Loggia

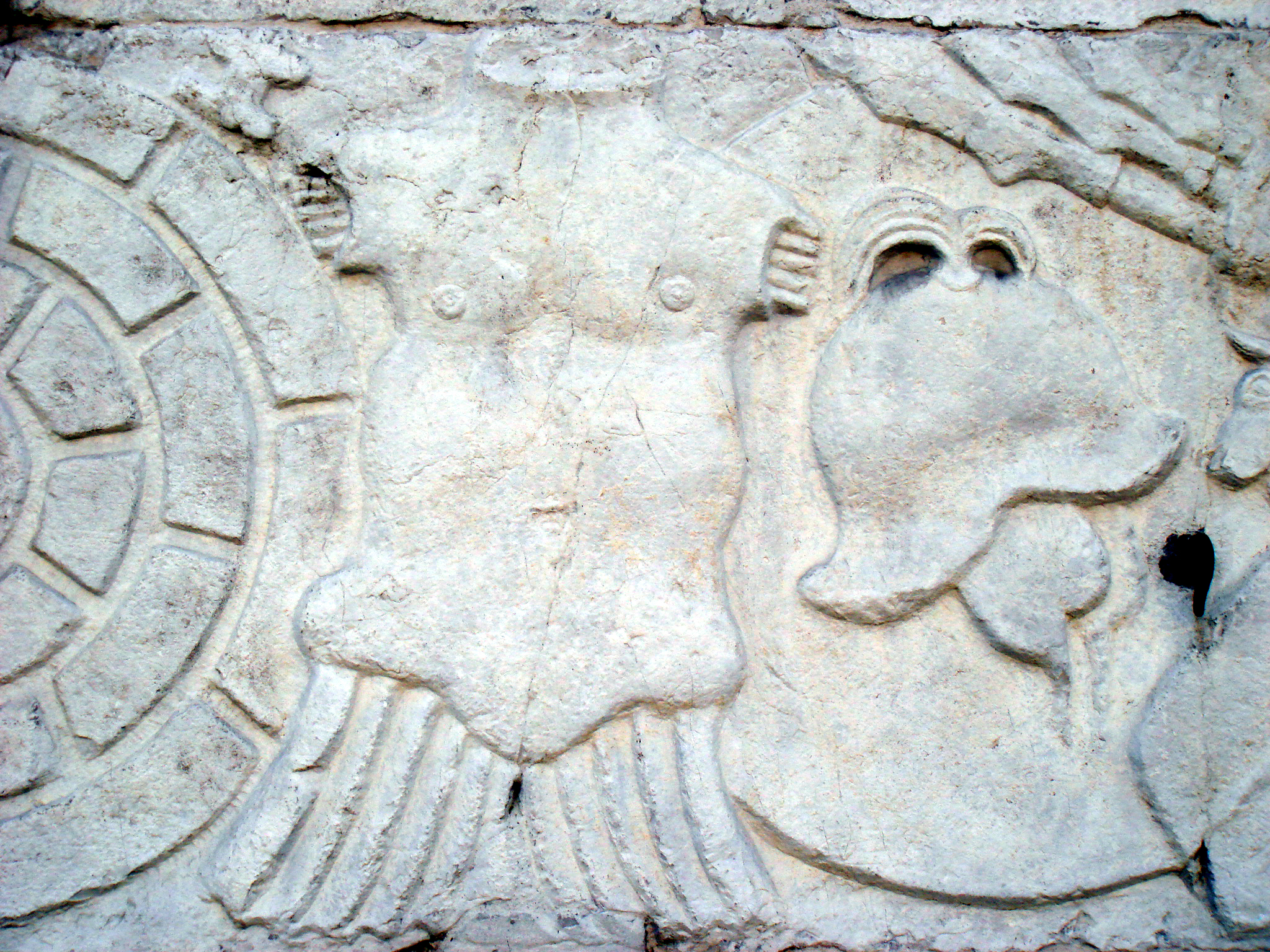
Roman tombstone on the facade of the Mount of Piety

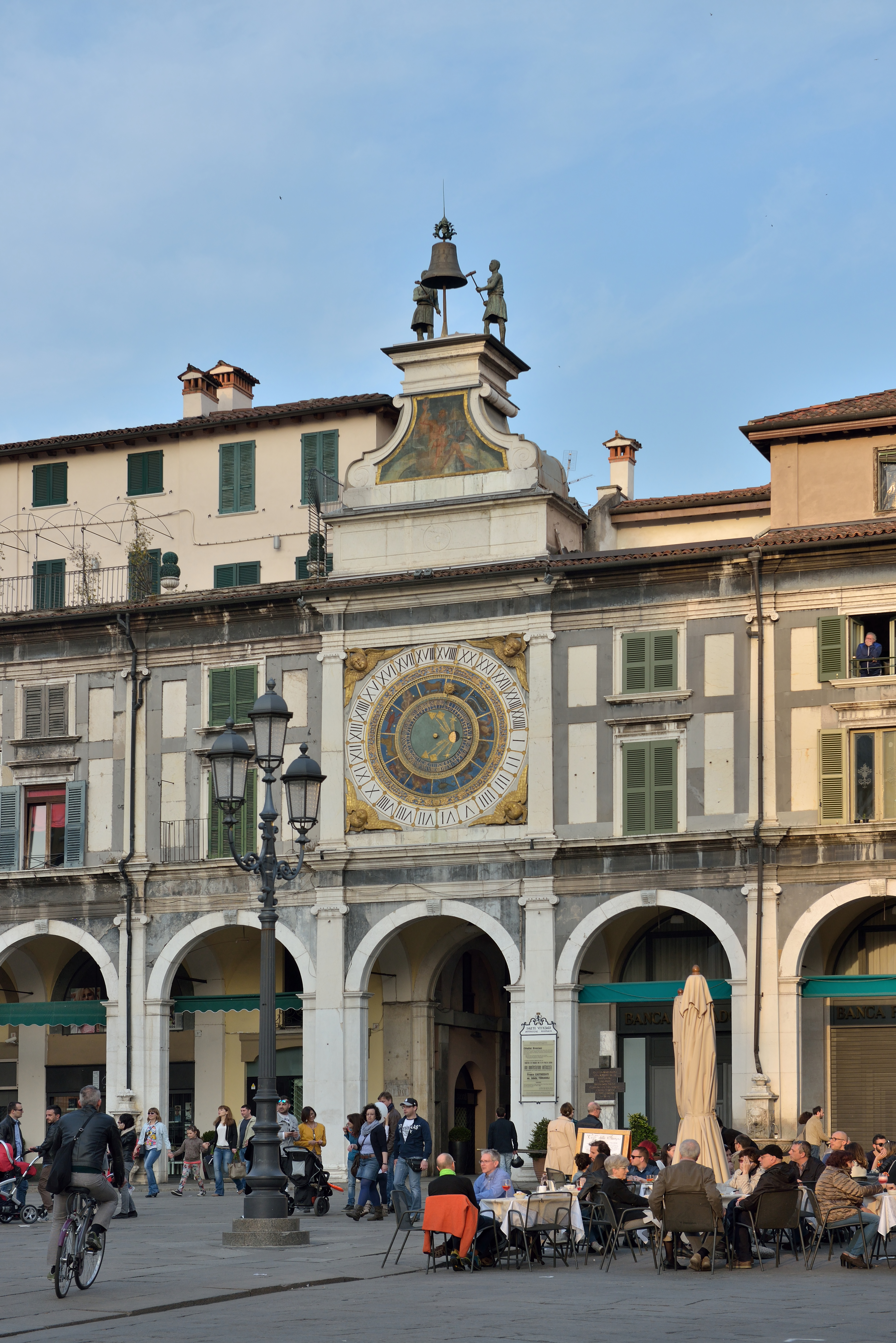
Clock Tower

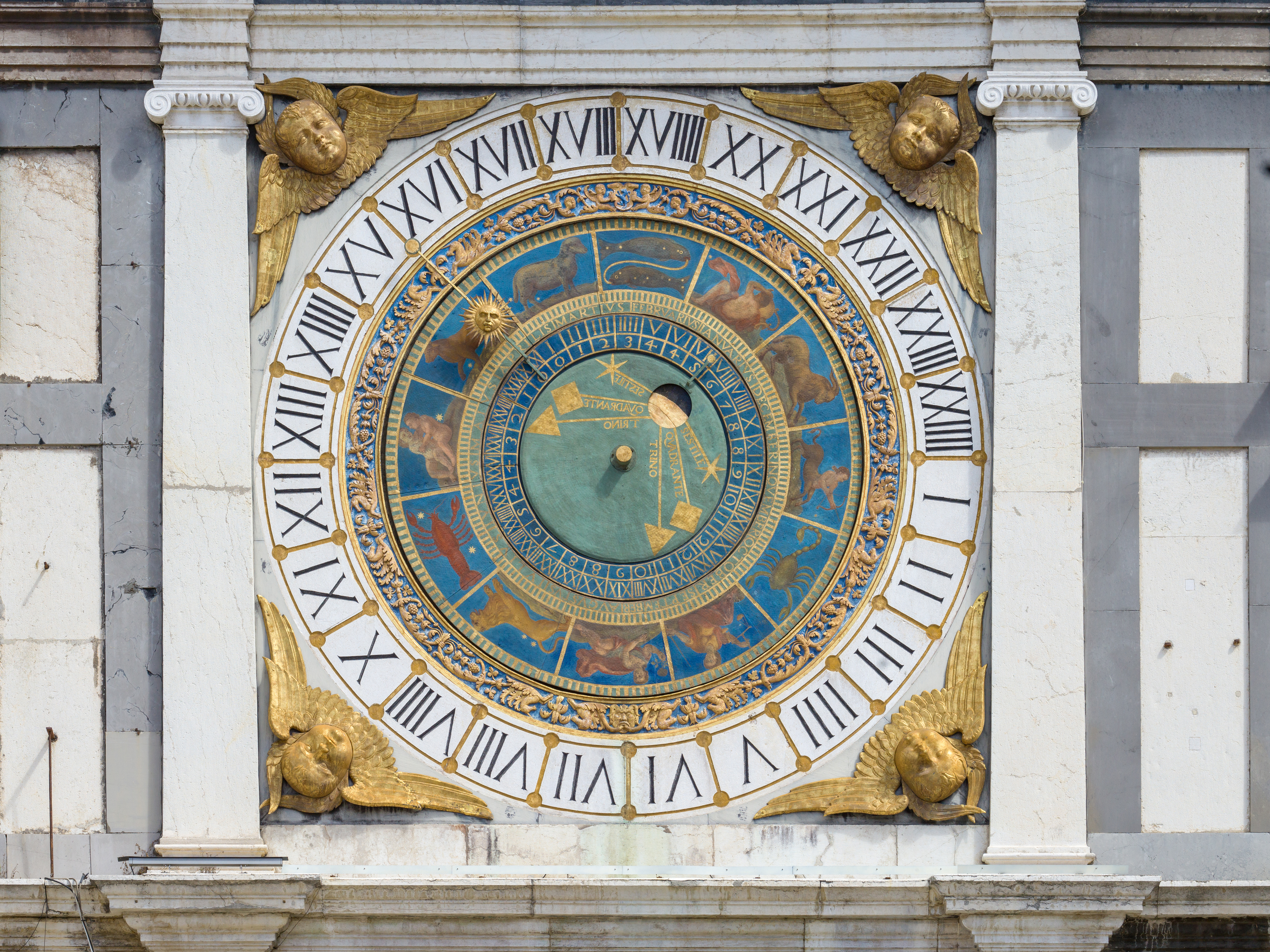
Astronomical clock

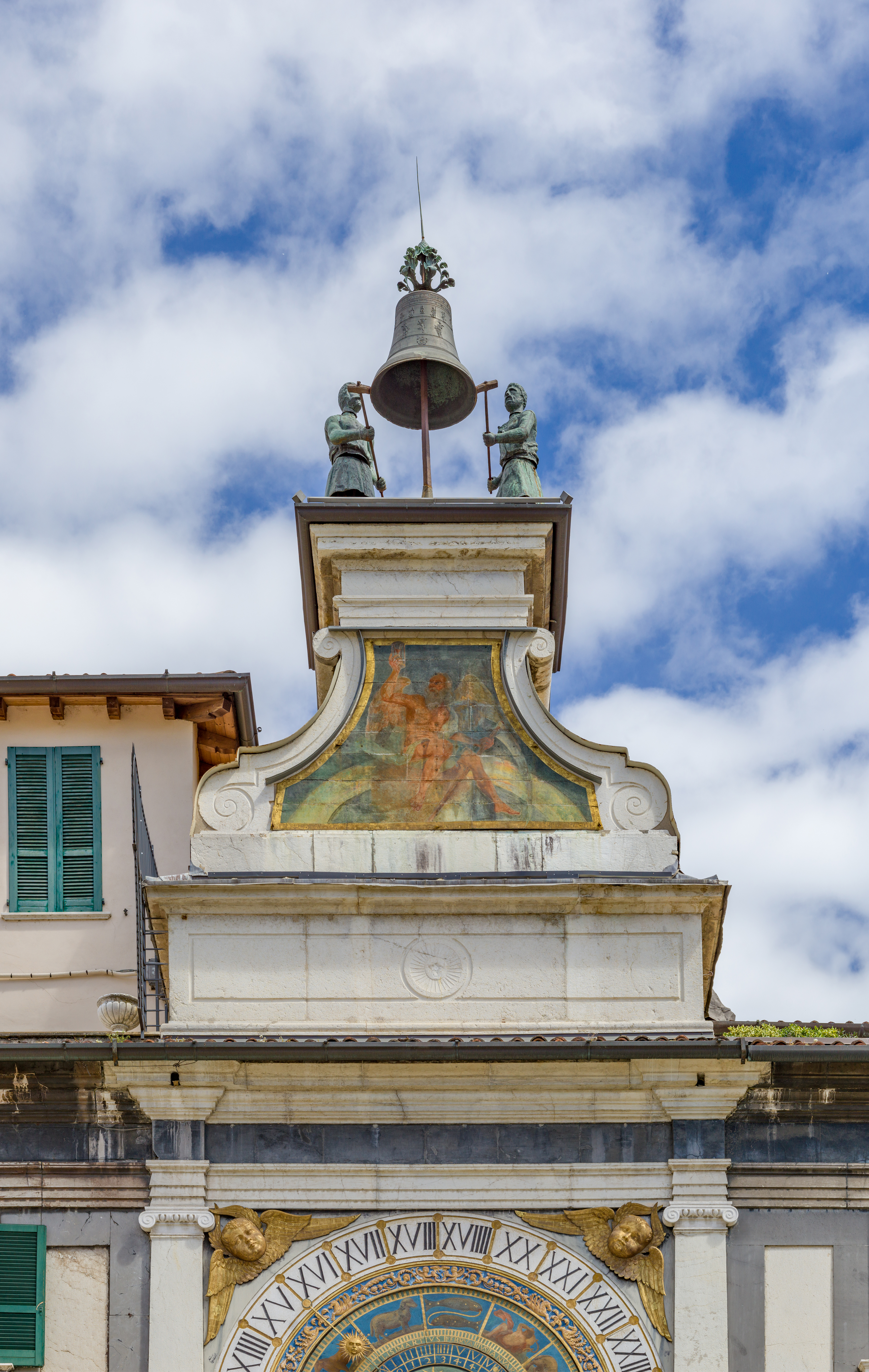
"Màcc dè le ure"

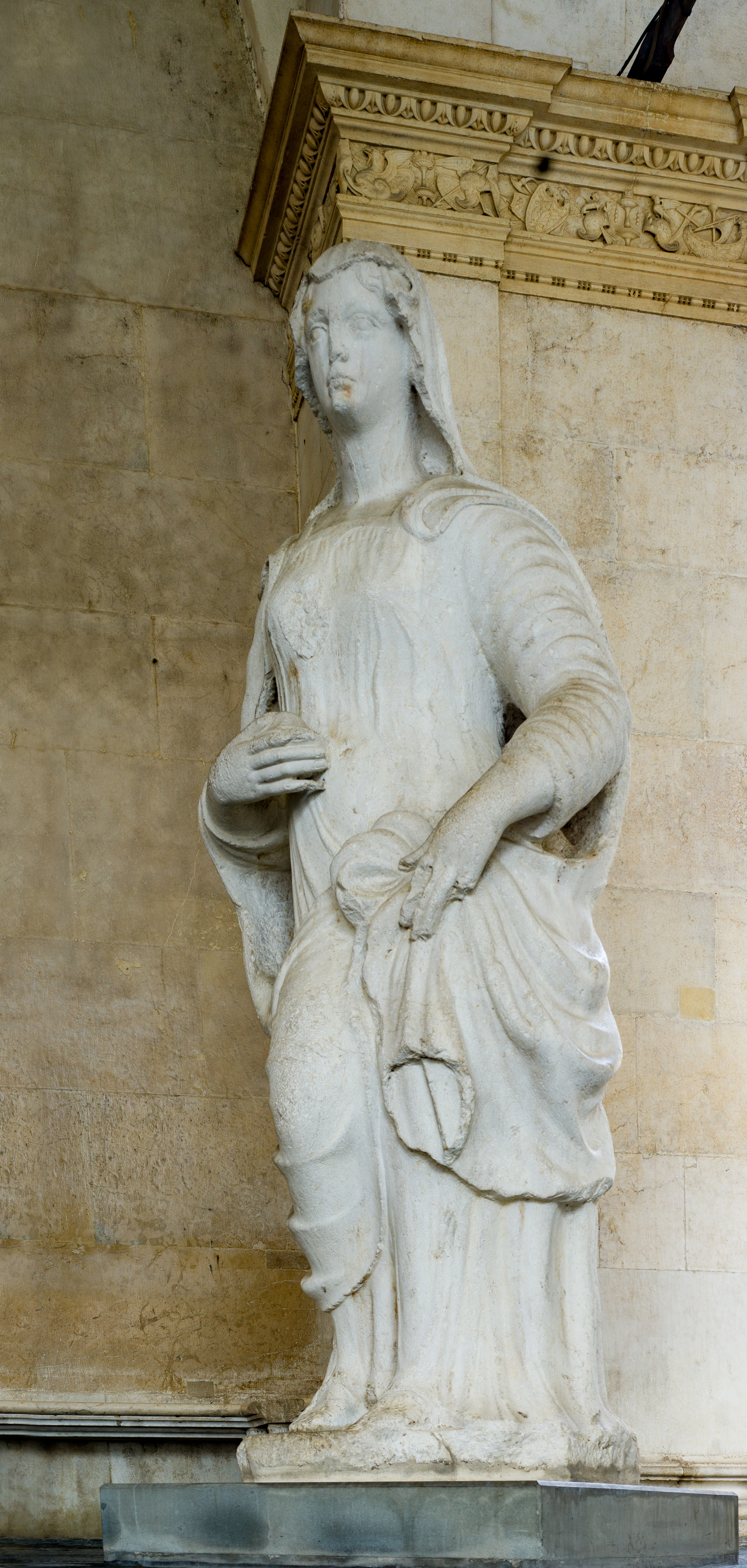
Lodoiga

The “Beautiful Italy”

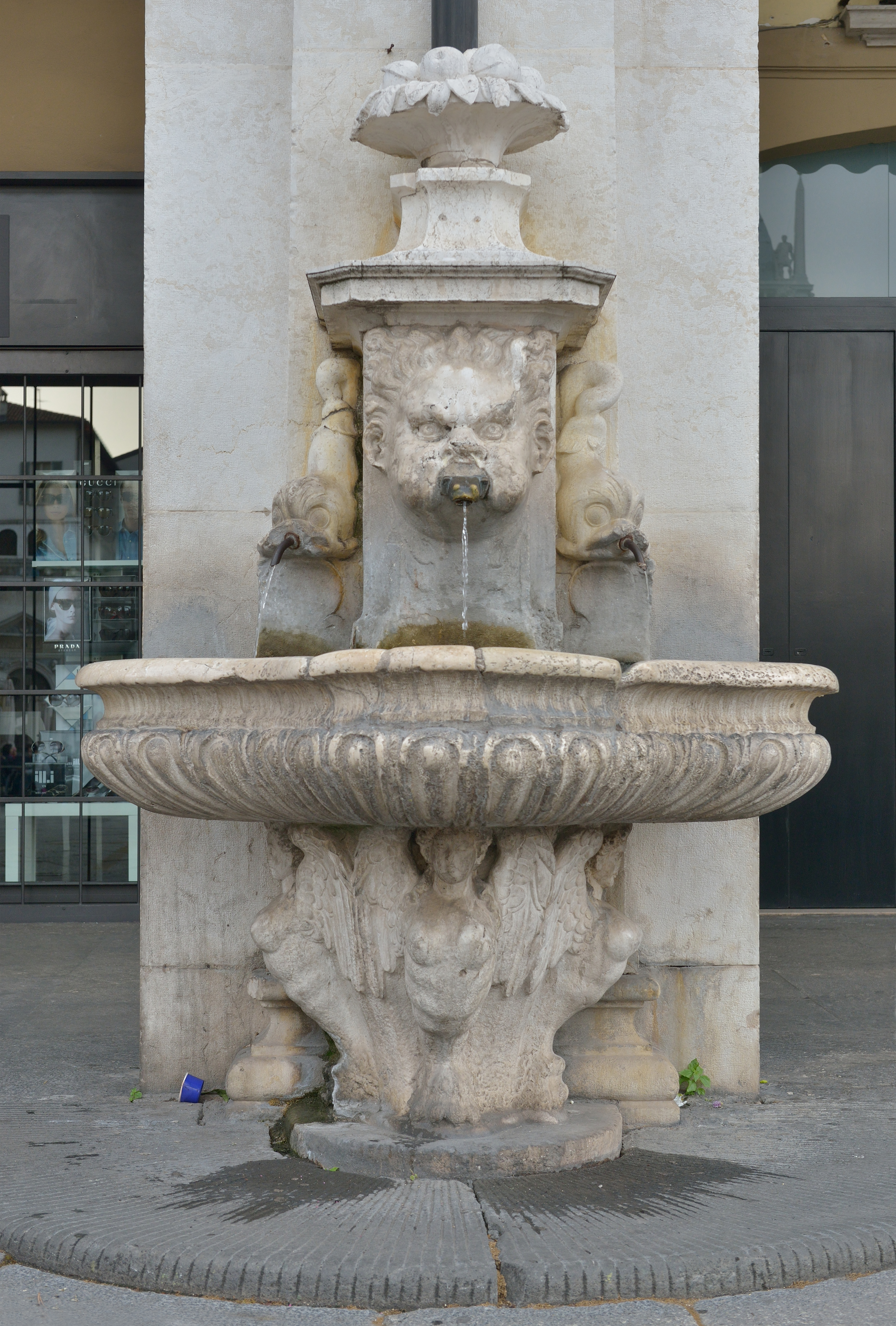
The Fountain of the Dolphins

Casa Vender

== See also ==
- Piazza della Loggia bombing
- Brescian Renaissance sculpture
- Palazzo della Loggia (Brescia)
- Torre dell'Orologio, Brescia

== Bibliography ==
Ancient sources

- Zamboni, Baldassarre (1778). Memorie intorno alle pubbliche fabbriche più insigni della città di Brescia. Raccolte da Baldassarre Zamboni Arciprete di Calvisano. Brescia: Pietro Vescovi.
- Spini, Patrizio (1585). "Il suplimento delle historie bresciane". Delle Historie bresciane di Helia Cavriolo. Brescia: appresso Pietro Maria Marchetti. pp. 257–344.

Modern sources

- Fè d'Ostiani, Luigi Francesco (1927). "La Piazza Vecchia e la Loggia". In Guerrini, Paolo (ed.). Storia, tradizione e arte nelle vie di Brescia. Brescia: Figli di Maria Immacolata. pp. 355–366.
- Panazza, Gaetano (1958). I civici musei e la Pinacoteca di Brescia. Brescia: Credito Agrario Bresciano.
- Fappani, Antonio (1987), "LOGGIA, piazza", LOGGIA, piazza - Enciclopedia Bresciana, Enciclopedia bresciana, vol. 7, Brescia: La Voce del Popolo, OCLC 163181989
- Simonetto, Roberta; Braga, Marina (2004). "Piazza della Loggia". Verso porta san Nazaro. Brescia: Sant'Eustacchio. pp. 11–24.
- Battilotti, Donata (2016). "Palladio a Brescia e la Loggia "che apresso di noi meriteria nome di eccellentissima"". Brescia nel secondo Cinquecento. Architettura, arte e società (PDF). Brescia: Morcelliana. pp. 145–162. ISBN 978-88-372-3015-9.
- Zani, Vito (2011). "Maestri e cantieri nel Quattrocento e nella prima metà del Cinquecento". Scultura in Lombardia. Arti plastiche a Brescia e nel Bresciano dal XV al XX secolo. Milano: Skira. ISBN 978-88-572-0523-6. OCLC 936152663.
- Lupo, G. (1991). "Platea magna Communis Brixiae (1433-1509)". La piazza, la chiesa, il parco. Saggi di storia dell'architettura (XV-XIX secolo). Milano: Electa. pp. 56–95.
- Lupo, G. (1989). "«Ad statue pristinum reducatur»: la città di Brescia nelle aspirazioni cittadine e l'apertura di Piazza della Loggia, 1433-1484". Commentari dell'Ateneo di Brescia. 188. Brescia: Ateneo di Brescia: 421–442.
- Zani, Vito (2010). Gasparo Cairano e la scultura monumentale del Rinascimento a Brescia (1489-1517 ca.). Roccafranca: La Compagnia della Stampa. ISBN 978-88-8486-400-0. OCLC 800227892.
- Frati, Vasco; Gianfranceschi, Ida; Robecchi, Franco (1995a). "1: Dall'apertura della piazza alla posa della prima pietra del Palazzo della Loggia, 1433-1492". La Loggia di Brescia e la sua piazza. Evoluzione di un fulcro urbano nella storia di mezzo millennio. Brescia: Grafo. ISBN 88-7385-211-4.
- Frati, Vasco; Gianfranceschi, Ida; Robecchi, Franco (1995b). "2: La costruzione del palazzo, 1492-1574: dalla cultura bramantesca agli interventi di Sansovino, Palladio e Tiziano". La Loggia di Brescia e la sua piazza. Evoluzione di un fulcro urbano nella storia di mezzo millennio. Brescia: Grafo. ISBN 88-7385-269-6.
- Frati, Vasco; Gianfranceschi, Ida; Robecchi, Franco (1995c). "3: Il completamento cinquecentesco della piazza, i progetti e gli interventi per la ricostruzione e il restauro della Loggia dal Settecento a oggi, il palazzo e la piazza coinvolti nella vicenda dell'urbanistica moderna". La Loggia di Brescia e la sua piazza. Evoluzione di un fulcro urbano nella storia di mezzo millennio. Brescia: Grafo. ISBN 88-7385-279-3.
- Hemsoll, Davies (1992–1993). Le piazze di Brescia nel Medioevo e nel Rinascimento. Lo sviluppo di piazza della Loggia. Vol. IV–V. Milano: Electa. pp. 168–177. ISBN 88-435-4414-4.
- Hemsoll, David (1995). "Bramante and the Palazzo della Loggia in Brescia". Arte Lombarda (86-87 (3-4)). Vita e Pensiero: 167–179. ISSN 0004-3443. JSTOR 43132687.
- Bowd, Stephen D. (2010). Venice's most loyal city: civic identity in Renaissance Brescia. Londra: Harvard University Press. ISBN 9780674051201.
- Savy, Barbara Maria; Svalduz, Elena (2016). "Uno sguardo sulla città: Brescia dopo il "Sacco"". Brescia nel secondo Cinquecento, Architettura, arte e società. Brescia: Morcelliana. pp. 127–143. ISBN 978-88-372-3015-9.
- Piazza, Filippo (2018). "Tiziano e le tele della Loggia di Brescia: cronaca di una disavventura". Tiziano e la pittura del Cinquecento tra Venezia e Brescia. Cinisello Balsamo: Silvana. pp. 178–199. ISBN 978-88-366-3938-0.
- De Leonardis, Francesco (2018). Guida di Brescia, La storia, l'arte, il volto della città. Brescia: Grafo. ISBN 9788873859918. OCLC 1124648622.
- Fisogni, Fiorenzo (2011). Scultori e lapicidi a Brescia dal tardo classicismo cinquecentesco al rococò. Milan: Skira.
