= Palazzo della Loggia (Brescia) =

Historical building in Brescia, Italy

Loggia Palace, Brescia
- Palazzo della Loggia

General information
- Type: Renaissance
- Coordinates: 45.5399°N 10.2192°E
- Construction started: 1492
- Estimated completion: 1574

Palazzo della Loggia (the Loggia palace, or the Loggia) is a Renaissance palace situated in the eponymous piazza in Brescia.

== History ==
In 1484, the city authorities of Brescia decided to dedicate a new building to its citizens to express good governance. It was planned to replace the original loggia and to add to the monumental architecture of the Piazza della Loggia, which was coming up at the same time.

The function of the building during the Venetian domination of Brescia was to host the hearings of the Venetian Podestà, whose Consiglio Cittadino and the Collegio dei Notai demonstrated the centrality of the building in city life, both geographically and politically.

The first proposal was by Tomaso Formentone, an architect from Vicenza, who designed a wooden model. But Formentone was not a prolific architect, and was at the time also involved in the Basilica at Vicenza. It is unlikely, therefore, that he was a chief designer of Brescia's biggest building. More likely, per references to him in documents as a carpenter, Formentone's contribution was operational. Given the similarity between this building and the others by Donato Bramante in Milan, it has been suggested that the design of the building was possibly the latter. Formenton's idea involved building completely in wood, but this proposal was immediately abandoned, in favour of a host of Venetian and Lombard stonemasons and marble from Botticino.

The first stone was laid in 1492. The works were directed by Filippo Grassi, a stonecutter who had already been active in the city for over a decade, and whose professional culmination was this project. The French invasions starting in 1509 and the sack of Brescia in 1512 interrupted construction. The work resumed in 1535 and the palace was completed in 1574 after numerous interventions by the most famous architects of the time, including Jacopo Sansovino, Andrea Palladio, and Lodovico Beretta who completed the building.

Much of the driving force behind the construction of the Piazza and the Palazzo was by the ruling Venetians, and there are inspirations, particularly in the use of white stone, roof design and the upper windows that stem from Venice. However, the Brescians wanted to establish their distinctiveness as well, and hearkened back to Roman antiquity by embedding discovered Latin inscriptions into the Piazza.

== Description ==
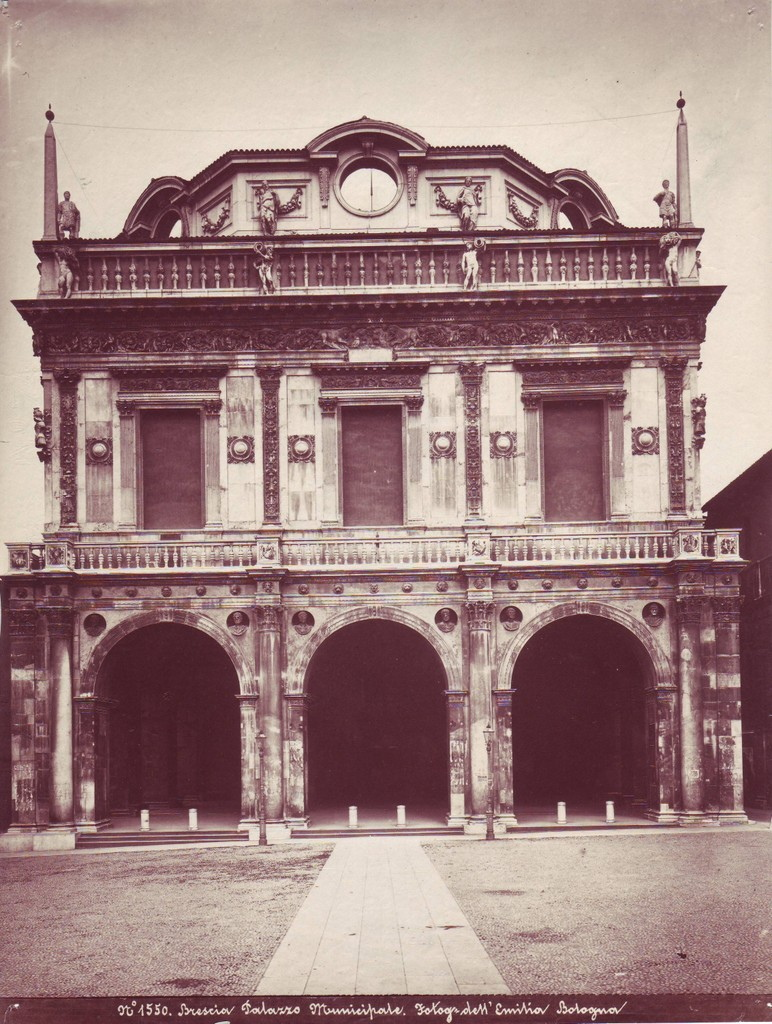
Photo of the Loggia with the Vanvitelli roof.

The Loggia is a large building, three bays wide by five bays long, the front forming a loggia while the back was for offices. It is 30 metres wide and 47 metres long, 20 metres tall with 18 metres of roofing. It was constructed atop foundations that covered and channelled the Garza brook.

The three arches facing the Piazza della Loggia were Filippo Grassi's contribution from 1492, supporting the frontal loggia.

The white Botticino marble facade is vertically composed of two distinct architectural sections. The lower section, completed in 1501, there are a series of columns and pillars interspersed with pendentives. These hosted the important cycle of the thirty Caesars, twenty-four of which were sculpted by Gasparo Cairano, the pre-eminent exponent of sculpture in Renaissance Brescia, and six by Tamagnino. The large arcades of the loggia are open on three sides of the building. The second level, corresponding to the late sixteenth century, houses large pilasters framing big windows in series, each corresponding to the arch of the loggia below, and encompassing the four faces of the building.

The original roof made of wood covered with lead sheets, in the shape of a boat's hull, was destroyed in a fire in 1575, in which three paintings by Titian were also lost. Until 1769 when a ceiling by Luigi Vanvitelli was installed, a temporary cover remained. In 1914, the Vanvitelli roof was replaced by a reproduction of the original roof.

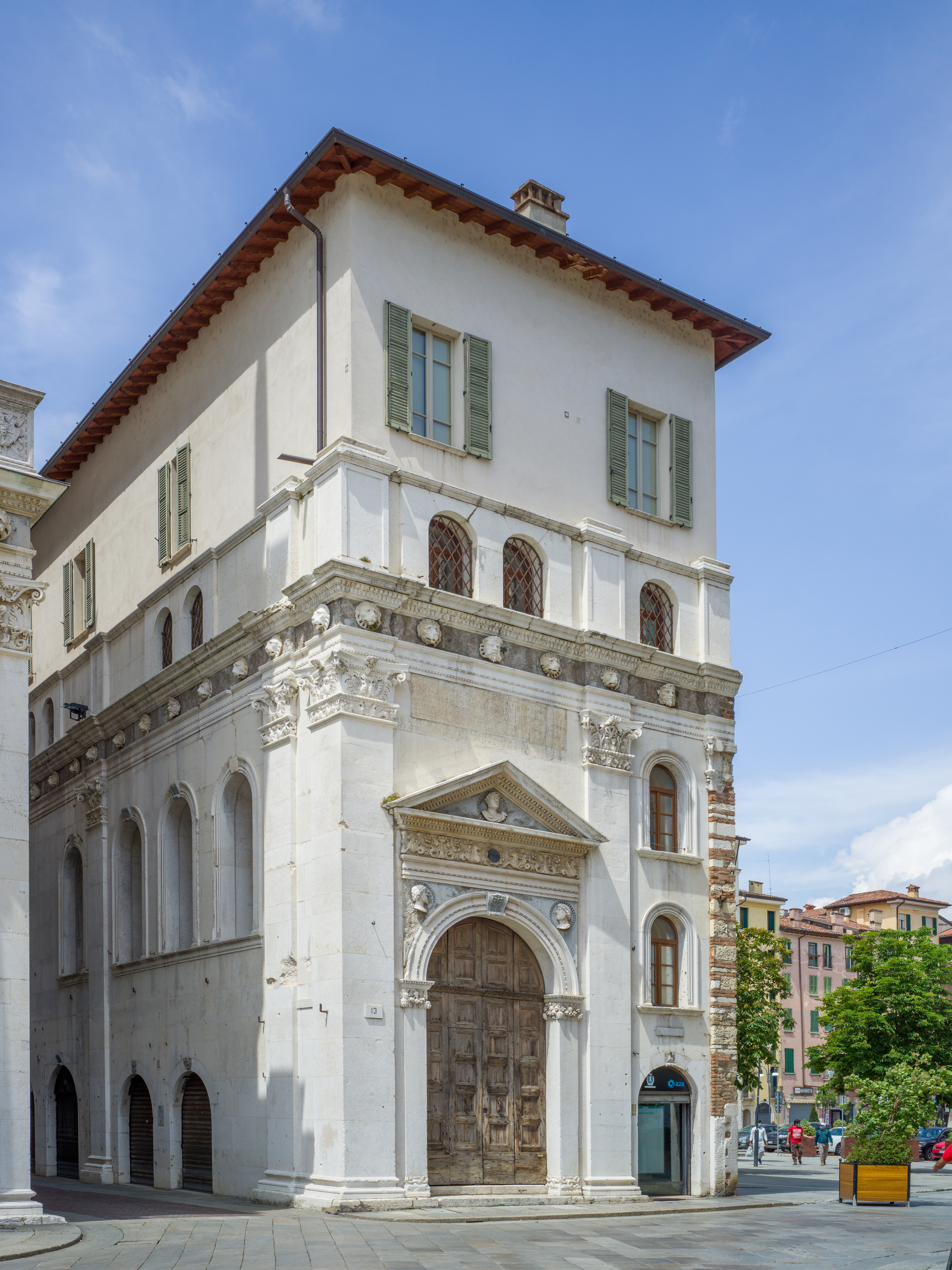
Old entrance through the staircase portal of the Loggia.

Another building was added between 1503 and 1508 located on the northern side of the loggia, containing the staircase leading to the upper hall. The entrance at street level was another work by Gasparo Cairano; it contains a plaque from 1177 a conviction for treason and perjury, taken from the basilica of San Pietro de Dom. In modern times, this building overlooking the Piazza Rovetta is only used for special occasions.

The portico at the base of the building, covered with cross-vaults decorated by a cycle of keystones by Gasparo Cairano, was established between 1497 and 1502. Entering here, the Stefano Lamberti portal of 1552 is visible, flanked by columns and two fountains in Botticino marble by Nicolò da Grado, and introducing the Antonio Tagliaferri staircase of 1876. In the early 20th century, painters such as Arturo Castelli decorated it, painting Brescia armed in the ceiling above the staircase. Cesare Bertolotti added the Mercury and Venus on a lunette on the left wall of the stairs, while Gaetano Cresseri accomplished Rome Triumphant in the ceiling of the atrium.

Palladio was consulted on the upper level in 1550. Indeed, he had been unhappy with the previously established windows, calling them too small and disproportionate, and obstructed by the four columns which are placed in them for ornamentation. A remodeled sketch by Palladio shows windows to replace the old ones.

The Salone Vanvitelliano on the upper floor, set up for an event, March 2026

The upper level comprises Luigi Vanvitelli's 18th century vast octagonal hall (called Salone Vanvitelliano). This has a wooden ceiling supported by eight brick columns resting on marble bases placed at the four corners. At the entrance is a lunette containing Cresseri's fresco Vulcan's Workshop; in the General Secretary's office is another painting, Recovery of Winged Victory.

The brothers Giulio Campi and Antonio Campi painted canvases for the palazzo starting in 1549.

The Lodoiga, an old Brescian statue with a controversial history, has been re-installed in the Loggia since 2011.

== Bibliography ==
- Banta, Andaleeb B. (2004). "Artists' Biographies". In Bayer, A.; Gregori, M. (eds.). Painters of Reality: The Legacy of Leonardo and Caravaggio in Lombardy. New York: Metropolitan Museum of Art. ISBN 9781588391179.
- Canniffe, Eamonn (2016). The Politics of the Piazza: The History and Meaning of the Italian Square. Routledge. ISBN 9781317019909.
- Cat, A.M. Ajmone; Campa, E.; Lodico, M.; Umiliaco, C. (2013). "New underground lines in historic centres: Experiences in Brescia". In Bilotta, E.; Flora, A.; Lirer, S.; Viggiani, C. (eds.). Geotechnical Engineering for the Preservation of Monuments and Historic Sites. CRC Press. ISBN 9781138000551.
- Hemsoll, David (1988). "Bramante and the Palazzo della Loggia in Brescia". Arte Lombarda (86/87): 167–179. JSTOR 43132687.
- Zani, Vito (2010). Gasparo Cairano. Roccafranca.
- "La Lodoìga". Turismo Brescia. Archived from the original on 2021-02-25.
- "Palazzo della Loggia". Brescia Online. Archived from the original on 2018-06-17.

== Related links ==
- Piazza della Loggia bombing
- Gasparo Cairano
