= Ludovico Beretta =

Italian architect

Lodovico Beretta
- Born: 1518; Brescia
- Died: 1572; Brescia
- Known for: Architecture
- Notable work: Palazzo della Loggia (Brescia)
- Movement: High Renaissance

Ludovico (or Lodovico) Beretta (1518 – 1572) was an Italian architect of the Brescian renaissance. His work is considered emblematic of the development of the Renaissance architectural paradigm in the middle of the sixteenth century.

== Life ==
Lodovico Beretta is known to have been a timber merchant in Condino between 1543–1574, and later a master builder and architect. His artistic and architectural training was influenced by the works of fellow citizen Antonio Zurlengo, who worked towards the end of the 15th century and rose to prominence for the Monte di Pietà built in 1484.

Palazzo della Loggia in Brescia

On 7 July 1545, he took over the parish of Condino in his brother Francesco's name. He then helped strengthen the structure of the new parish church which was threatening to collapse. In 1550, he was appointed as architect of Brescia, renewed in 1552 for another five years.

Beretta designed the Strada Nuova in Brescia (today's Via Beccaria) joining the Piazza della Loggia with the Piazza Duomo in 1552, and incorporating a standardised set of shops and houses with thin arches. In 1559, he designed the Case del Gambero, a set of mansions in the historical centre of Brescia (with frescoes attributed to Lattanzio Gambara); in 1560, he directed the expansion works of the Chiesa dei Miracoli, and in 1566, he restored the parish church of Gambara as well as that of Fiesse on behalf of the bishop Bollani. In 1566, also, he designed a new cathedral for Brescia: the designs, praised as a beautiful and very proportionate invention by Palladio, were lost.

In 1567, Beretta designed the Seminary of Brescia, near San Gaetano. He directed the architectural works for the Palazzo della Loggia in Brescia, which had originally begun in the previous century. He had proposed solutions for the orders of arches, but these were abandoned. Works begun in 1553 were modified in 1554 following an intervention by Sansovino. The upper hall of the palace was covered in 1560, while the windows, incorporating suggestions from Palladio, were modified in 1562. The palace was nearly complete by Beretta's death, though a fire three years later destroyed its roof. Still, it appears today very nearly as the architect had completed it. Some of Brescia's finest interior architectures are its vestibules, preserved to date.

Beretta is considered the finest architect of the period, and his oeuvre extended to other palaces, notably of the Lana-Ghidella, the Dolzani-Masperi and the Martinengo-Cesaresco dell'Aquilone.

== See also ==
- Palazzo Averoldi

== Bibliography ==
- Le muse. Vol. II. Novara: De Agostini. 1964.
- Fappani, Antonio, ed. (1974). "Ludovico Beretta". Enciclopedia Bresciana. Vol. 1. Brescia.
- Peroni, Adriano (1967). "Berétta, Lodovico". Dizionario biografico degli Italiani. Vol. 9. Rome: Istituto dell'Enciclopedia Italiana.

== See also ==
- Palazzo della Loggia (Brescia)
