= Piazza della Loggia bombing =

1974 terror attack in Brescia, Italy

Coordinates: 45°32′23″N 10°13′14″E

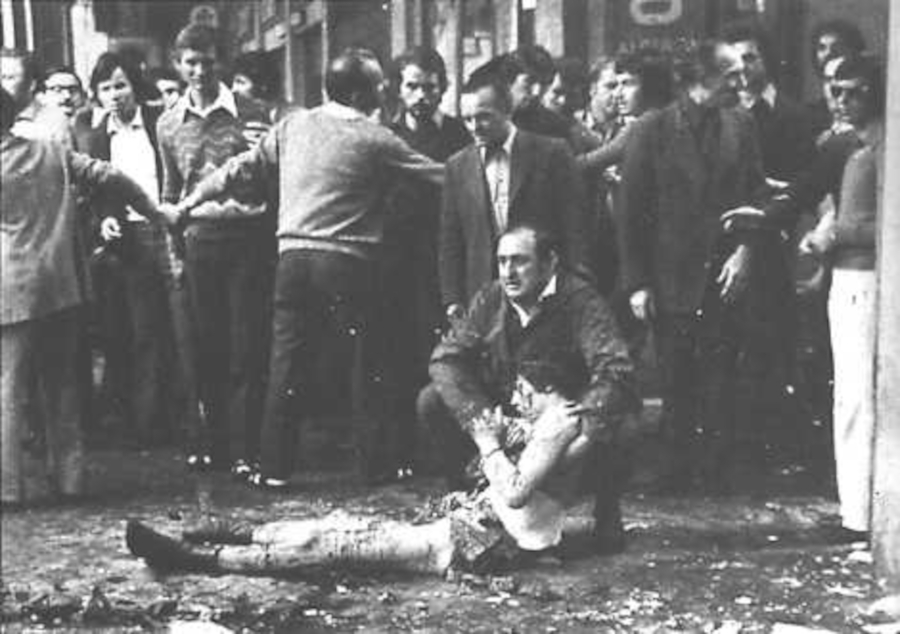
- Neo-fascist massacre in Piazza della Loggia, Brescia
- Location: Piazza della Loggia, Brescia, Italy
- Date: 28 May 1974; 10:12 (UTC+1)
- Target: Civilians
- Attack type: Bombing
- Weapon: IED
- Deaths: 8
- Injuries: 102
- Perpetrator: New Order

The Piazza della Loggia bombing (Italian: attentato di Piazza della Loggia) was a bombing that took place on the morning of 28 May 1974, in Piazza della Loggia, Brescia, Italy during an anti-fascist protest. The terrorist attack killed eight people and wounded 102. The bomb was placed inside a rubbish bin at the east end of the square. In 2015, a Court of appeal in Milan issued a final life sentence to Ordine Nuovo members Carlo Maria Maggi and Maurizio Tramonte for ordering the bombing, closing one of the longest-running cases on terrorism during Italy's years of lead.

== Overview ==
The first judicial investigation led to the condemnation in 1979 of a member of the Brescian far-right movement, Ermanno Buzzi. However, this first sentence was cancelled in 1982, but in 1983 the Court of Cassation declared the appeal process must be redone at the Court of Appeal in Venice. The suspects were acquitted in 1985 by the Court of Venice, and in 1987 by the Supreme Court of Cassation. Buzzi, killed in Novara's prison by neo-fascists Pierluigi Concutelli and Mario Tuti in 1981, was judged "a corpse to be carried out".

A second investigation led to the accusation of other far-right activists: Cesare Ferri, Sergio Latini and Alessandro Stepanoff. They were acquitted for lack of evidence in 1987; in 1989 Ferri and Latini were acquitted of having committed the crime, Stepanoff for lack of evidence.

A third investigation led to a trial for Francesco Delfino (a Carabiniere), Carlo Maria Maggi, Pino Rauti, Maurizio Tramonte and Delfo Zorzi (members of the Ordine Nuovo neo-fascist group). The presence of Tramonte in the place at the time of the blast was confirmed in 2008 by the results of an anthropological forensic test on a picture taken that day.

On 16 November 2010, the Court of Brescia acquitted the defendants (the prosecutor had requested life imprisonment for Delfino, Maggi, Tramonte and Zorzi, and the acquittal for lack of evidence for Pino Rauti). The four defendants were acquitted also in 2012, but in 2014 the supreme Court of Cassation declared the appeal process must be redone at the Court of appeal in Milan for Maggi and Tramonte. Delfino and Zorzi are finally acquitted. On 22 July 2015, the Court of appeal sentenced Maggi and Tramonte to life imprisonment for ordering and coordinating the massacre.

On 21 of June 2017, Tramonte was arrested in Portugal by the Portuguese Police in the Sanctuary of Fátima, while allegedly praying for forgiveness.

== Victims ==
1. Giulietta Banzi Bazoli (34, teacher)
2. Livia Bottardi Milani (32, teacher)
3. Euplo Natali (69, retired, former partisan)
4. Luigi Pinto (25, teacher)
5. Bartolomeo Talenti (56, labourer)
6. Alberto Trebeschi (37, teacher)
7. Clementina Calzari Trebeschi (31, teacher)
8. Vittorio Zambarda (60, labourer)

== 2000 report alleging US intelligence involvement ==
A 2000 parliamentary report by the centre-left Olive Tree coalition claimed "that US intelligence agents were informed in advance about several right-wing terrorist bombings, including the December 1969 Piazza Fontana bombing in Milan and the Piazza della Loggia bombing in Brescia five years later, but did nothing to alert the Italian authorities or to prevent the attacks from taking place. It also [alleged] that Pino Rauti [current leader of the Social Idea Movement ], a journalist and founder of the far-right Ordine Nuovo subversive organisation, received regular funding from a press officer at the US embassy in Rome. 'So even before the 'stabilising' plans that Atlantic circles had prepared for Italy became operational through the bombings, one of the leading members of the subversive right was literally in the pay of the American embassy in Rome,' the report says.

== See also ==
- La notte della Repubblica (TV programme)
- Operation Gladio
- Terrorism in the European Union
- Years of Lead (Italy)
