= Historiography of Gasparo Cairano =

Critical itinerary of Italian sculptor

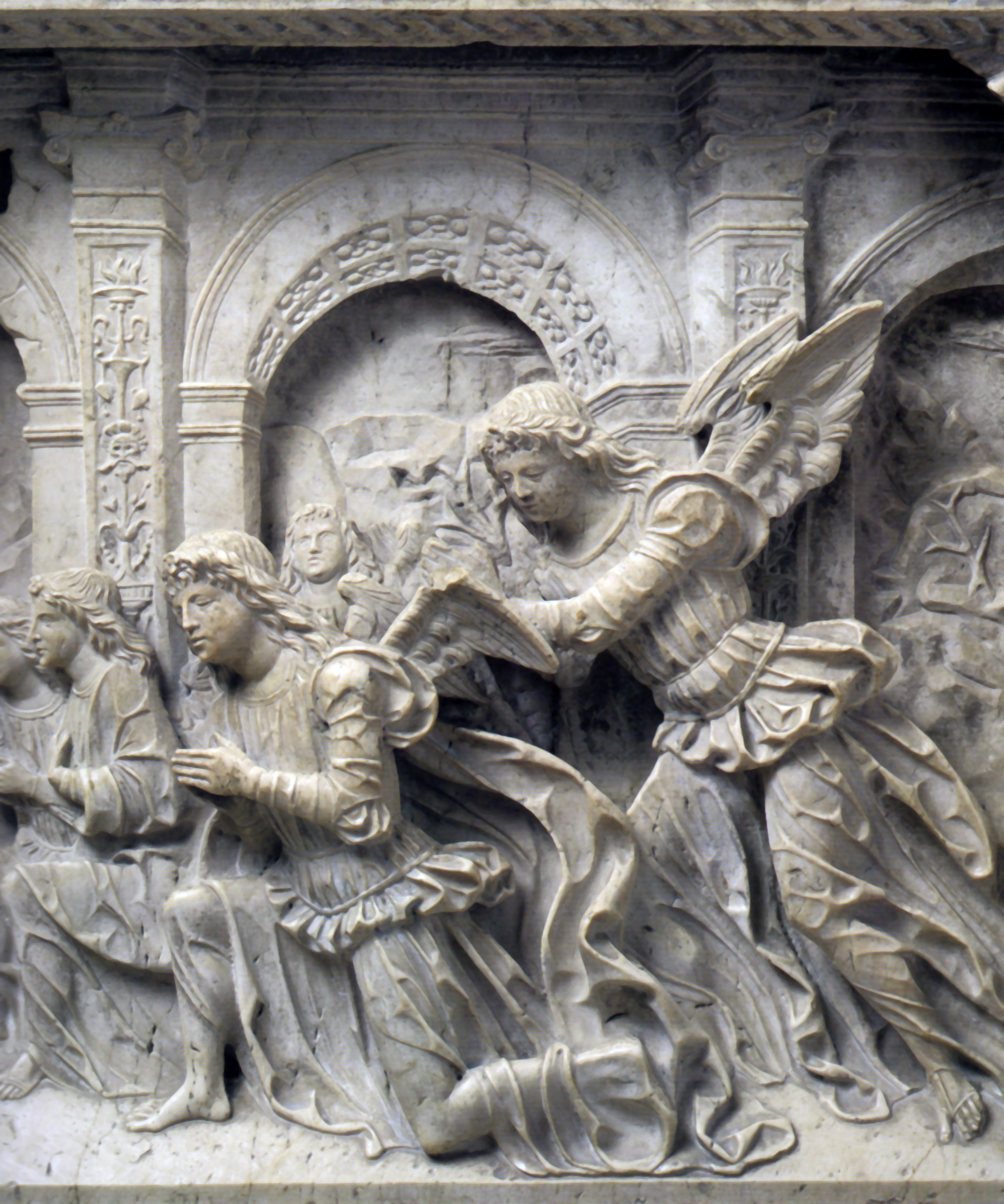
Gasparo Cairano, Caprioli Adoration (detail, 1495-1500), whose authorship has been the subject of much debate since the 19th century.

The historiography of Gasparo Cairano, which began during the sculptor's lifetime and remains incomplete even today after more than five hundred years, has involved numerous critical voices. This has resulted in a substantial and varied body of literature, yet it tends toward an almost total misrecognition of the artist and his work.

Along with Gasparo Cairano, the historiographical path of Brescian Renaissance sculpture and its other protagonists never received due recognition in artistic and literary culture, remaining forgotten even by local sources. The primary reason lies in a very long series of errors, omissions, and misunderstandings that occurred in the literary field from the outset, leading to a genuine oblivion regarding the cultural and qualitative level achieved by the Brescian School in the thirty years spanning the 15th and 16th centuries, as well as the names of its key figures. The loss of archival documents (Note: In particular, the accounts of the City of Brescia for the construction of the Loggia, the archives of the Church of Santa Maria dei Miracoli, all the documentation for the construction of San Pietro in Oliveto, the details of the commissions for the Martinengo Mausoleum and the Ark of St. Apollonius, and the Caprioli family papers were lost. The reasons for the loss of each document vary; see the bibliographical references for each work.) or of the works themselves, which were often fragmented or even destroyed, has certainly contributed, although much has been preserved. Only since the mid-20th century have new studies, supported by the recovery of archives, enabled the critical rediscovery not only of Gasparo Cairano but of the entire chapter of Brescian sculpture—a panorama still incomplete in many aspects and occasionally filled in by new research on documents and works.

== Historiographical path through the centuries ==
=== The silence of contemporary literature ===
One of the most striking silences is found in the local artistic literature contemporary to the sculptor's activity. Firstly, the timing of Marin Sanudo's visit to Brescia was inconvenient; a potential admirer of the burgeoning local Renaissance, he passed through in 1483, a few years before the start of work on the Church of Santa Maria dei Miracoli. Marcantonio Michiel, conversely, dedicated no chapter to Brescia in his Notizia d'opere di disegno (compiled starting in 1521). However, he did mention Gasparo Cairano, identifying him as the brother of "Anzolino Bressano, ovver Milanese," a master of terracotta, providing a valuable record of the Brescian sculptor at least four years after his death.

There is no mention of Gasparo Cairano in Elia Capriolo's chronicle of c. 1505, which only vaguely references the Brescian Renaissance flourishing at the time and its protagonists—"the painters, goldsmiths, and sculptors, emulators of Apelles and Praxiteles"—reserving praise only for the later Stefano Lamberti. Even the humanist Vosonius, in a Latin carmen dedicated to Brescia around 1498, sang its praises with classical poetic rhetoric, mentioning the Palazzo della Loggia but naming no sculptors. Likewise, the name of Cairano, and indeed that of any other figure from the Brescian sculptural scene of the time, does not appear in the manuscripts of Pandolfo Nassino and Lucillo Ducco.

Nevertheless, Gasparo Cairano must have enjoyed some posthumous fame, as Michiel's quotation suggests. This omission is also puzzling in light of Gasparo's descendants, for whom documents attest to individuals active in various artistic fields for at least two generations: between 1545 and 1561, Gasparo Cairano "the Younger"—also a sculptor, son of Simone and thus grandson of Gasparo "the Elder", from whom he even inherited his baptismal name—is recorded in various archival sources. (Note: Camillo Boselli has made known some documents about “Gasparo Cairano the Younger” that attest to his activity between 1545 and 1558: see Boselli (1977, p. 150 (regesto).) These include his membership in the Corporation of Stoneworkers in 1557 and, dated to the same year, a contract for the construction of some columns for the monastery of Santa Giulia in Brescia.)

=== The citation by Pomponius Gauricus ===
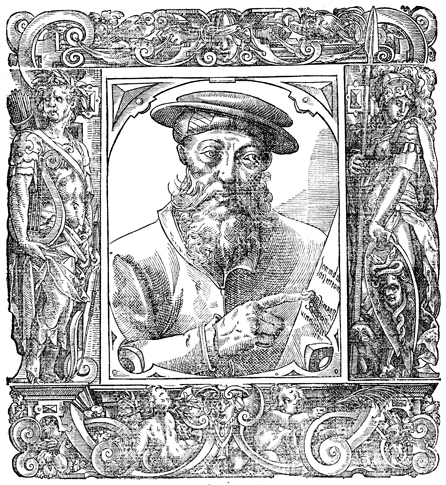
Portrait of Pomponius Gauricus.

Gasparo Cairano received a single, illustrious mention in the historiography of the period: Pomponius Gauricus's De sculptura, published in Florence in 1504. In it, the humanist offered the Brescian sculptor a flattering tribute in Latin, notably mentioning the Palazzo della Loggia and the Cycle of the Caesars:

Dignus et qui nominetur Brixiani praetorii architectura et Caesaribus Gaspar Mediolanensis
Worthy of mention, for the architecture of the Praetorian Palace of Brescia and for the Caesars, is Gasparo Milanese

—Pomponius Gauricus, De sculptura, pp. 254-255.

This note bestowed great honor upon the sculptor and his Caesars, as well as the Loggia's architecture. Just twelve years after construction began, they found a place alongside the great figures of Italian sculpture in a publication of profound artistic culture specifically dedicated to figurative matters; Cairano was the only Lombard sculptor named besides Cristoforo Solari. Gauricus cited not the carvings of the Sanctuary of the Miracles, but rather the architecture and the antique-style busts of the Loggia, thus signaling a clear preference for the modernity embodied in these works. However, this promise of fame would remain confined to the pages of De Sculptura: after the successful first Florentine edition in 1504, the treatise would not be republished in Italy for at least three hundred years, finding only limited circulation beyond the Alps. (Note: Notable are the Antwerp, Nuremberg and Brussels editions of 1528, 1542 and 1603, respectively. Cf. Zani (2010, p. 43) for further study.) Indeed, no reference to Gauricus is found in local sources or, more generally, in any art-related literature until the 19th century.

=== Giorgio Vasari's misunderstanding and Cairano's disappearance from contemporary literature ===
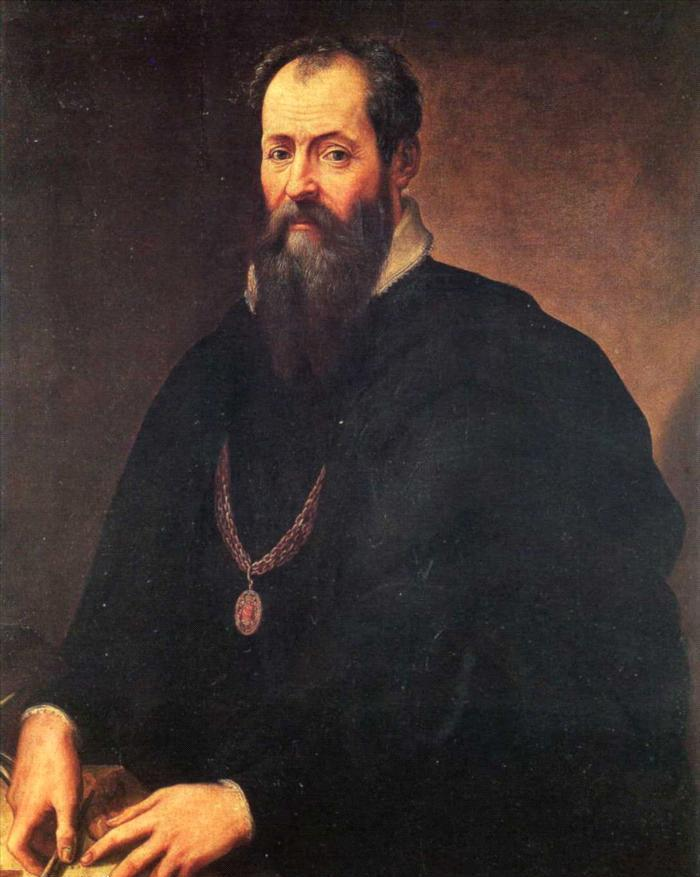
Self-portrait of Giorgio Vasari.

However, the primary responsibility for Gasparo Cairano's fall into oblivion, and for a series of misconceptions surrounding his figure, lies with Giorgio Vasari. In his Lives of the Most Excellent Painters, Sculptors, and Architects, in the section devoted to Lombard artists, the scholar states that he has "recently been in Brescia". Following this, he sings the praises of the great masters of local painting, showing a marked interest in painting over other arts. Renaissance sculpture receives only a passing mention concerning Giovanni Gaspare Pedoni from Lugano, "who has done many things in Cremona and Brescia [...] that are beautiful and praiseworthy". This involves a clear misunderstanding of the artist's identity, which was hugely consequential for art criticism in the centuries to come; indeed, Pedoni is entirely absent from the Brescian Renaissance scene, both in documents and attributed works.

At the time of his visit to Brescia and the compilation of the pages dedicated to it, Vasari was certainly aware of Pomponius Gauricus's De Sculptura, where "Gaspar Mediolanensis", author of the Loggia's Caesars, is named. It is likely, however, that no Brescian could provide him with further information about this sculptor, reflecting the ignorance revealed even by learned local sources of the time. Furthermore, sculptural taste had radically changed by then with the Mannerist revolution led by Jacopo Sansovino. Not coincidentally, Giacomo Medici, a pupil of Sansovino, is the only Brescian sculptor mentioned by Vasari. Possessing additional information about Pedoni's activity in nearby Cremona, Vasari probably conflated the two figures, identifying Gaspare Pedoni from Lugano (i.e., Milanese) with Gauricus's "Gaspar Mediolanensis", perhaps attributing the local ignorance to the sculptor's foreign origin. The publication of the Lives erased Gasparo Cairano's name from Brescian history for at least two centuries.

By the late 16th century, Brescian art literature, although interested in the works of its past—especially the Loggia and its rich palimpsest of sculptures—was no longer able to identify the names of the sculptors responsible. An example is Patrizio Spini's Supplimento, written in 1585 as an appendix to the vernacular edition of Elia Capriolo's Chronicle. Spini offers the reader a lengthy digression on the Loggia, in which the exaltation of every artistic detail starkly contrasts with the complete absence of the names of the artists behind such magnificence. Additionally, the involvement of figures such as Jacopo Sansovino, Andrea Palladio, and Galeazzo Alessi in the palace's construction (resumed mid-century) had focused scholarly interest primarily on architectural matters, relegating sculptural features to the background.

The last 16th-century mention of Gasparo Cairano appears not in Brescia but in Salò: Bongianni Grattarolo, in his Historia della Riviera di Salò (written 1587, printed Brescia 1599), still recalled "a master Gasparo Bresciano" as the author of the cathedral portal. However, this is merely an onomastic memory, disconnected from his historical and artistic identity, as well as from the works the sculptor produced in the city.

=== Between the 17th and 18th centuries ===
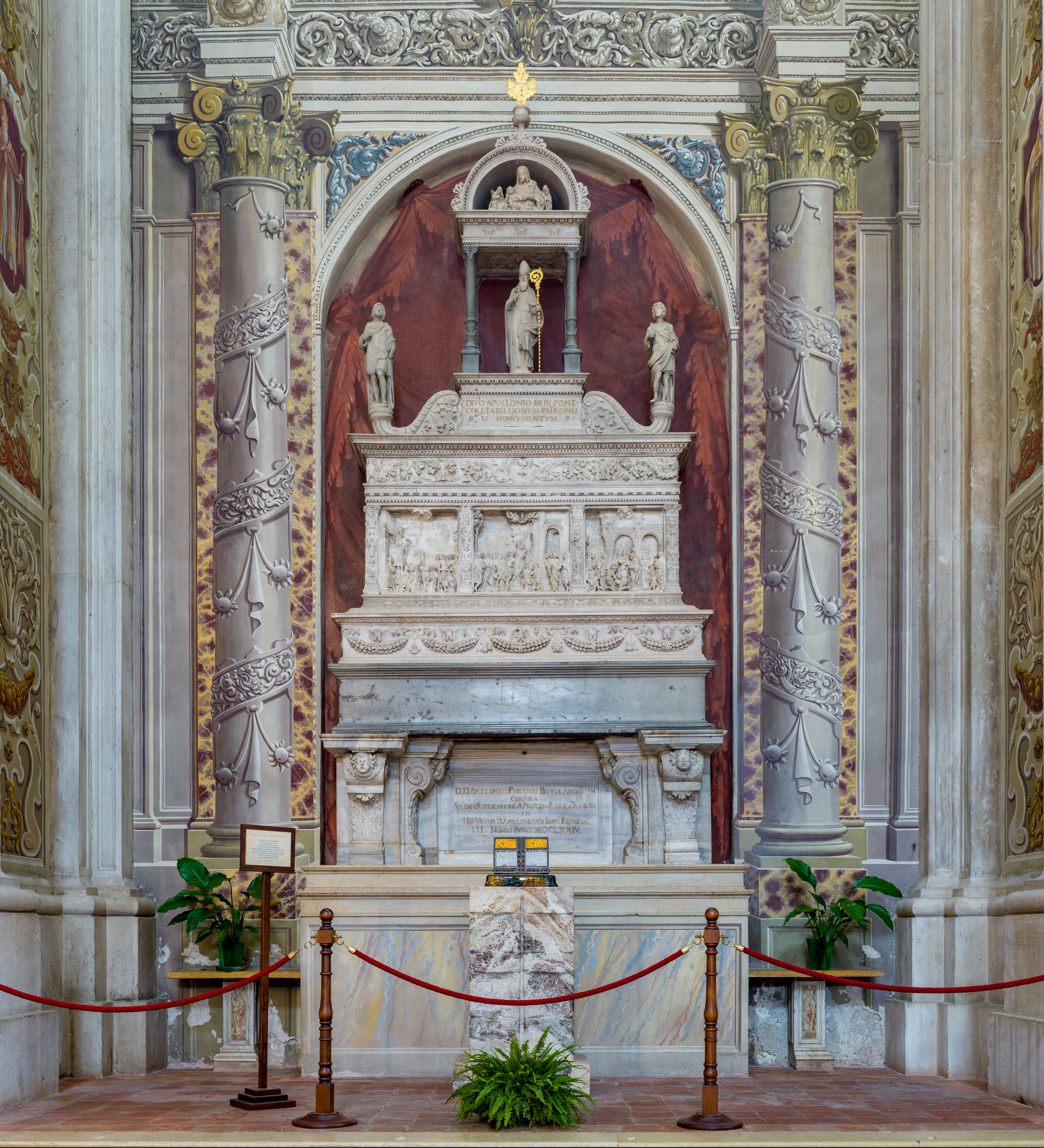
The Ark of Saint Apollonius (1508-1510).

By the 17th century, Brescian art literature focused on the local Renaissance scene only to celebrate its school of painting and its protagonists—Moretto, Romanino, and Vincenzo Foppa. The flourishing field of sculpture remained unexplored, with no attempt made to address this gap, almost as if the problem did not exist. During the same period, a type of local, anti-Vasarian art literature began to spread in Brescia, as in the rest of northern Italy, aiming to rehabilitate figures neglected in the Lives. However, this new trend also failed to yield significant results. In Brescia, the most important text of this genre is Ottavio Rossi's Elogi Historici di Bresciani illustri, published in 1620, where the author praises all the most famous Brescian painters. The only local sculptor mentioned, however, is the Sansovino follower Giacomo Medici, cited by Giorgio Vasari as "one of the rarest sculptors in Italy". The fact that works like the facade of Santa Maria dei Miracoli and the Loggia's Caesars significantly predate Medici seems not to concern the Brescian scholar, possibly due to a genuine misunderstanding of pre-Mannerist styles introduced by Sansovino. Thus began a new critical trend viewing Giacomo Medici as the illustrious creator of Brescian works, significantly impacting the bibliography following Rossi. (Note: There are at least two seventeenth-century publications praising Giacomo Medici with clear reference to Rossi, namely Calzavacca (1654, p. 47) and Cozzando (1694, p. 132). See also Zani (2010, pp. 48–49, nn. 63, 64.))

Nevertheless, the 17th century also saw the first glimmers of interest in the sculptural works of the Brescian Renaissance; though misunderstood, they managed to arouse the curiosity of local writers. First among these is Bernardino Faino's guide to the city, the earliest historical guide to Brescia. The scholar observed the Ark of St. Apollonius and its "small, beautiful stories of the saint", taking care to specify that "the author of this work is not known, being an ancient thing". Similarly, the Caprioli Adoration, which Faino correctly saw installed in the lost tomb of Luigi Caprioli in San Giorgio, is described as "a carefully made thing, a very ancient thing." Similar praise for the Caprioli relief appears in Francesco Paglia's Giardino della Pittura, written between 1675 and 1713. In the chapter dedicated to the Old Cathedral, after honoring Alessandro Vittoria's funeral monument for Domenico Bollani, Paglia states that "it is best to omit certain other little things"—referring to none other than the Ark of Berardo Maggi and the funeral monument of Domenico de Dominici—to admire an "ark carved with beautiful figures of white marble", namely the Ark of St. Apollonius, housed in the Winter Cathedral during those years. In praising the Loggia, Paglia also ventured attributions involving Bramante and, again, Giacomo Medici, names drawn from earlier literature. Considerations similar to the previous ones were also elaborated by Giulio Antonio Averoldi in his guide to Brescia printed in 1700, which extensively praises the sculptures of San Pietro in Oliveto as well; by Francesco Maccarinelli's guide written in the mid-18th century; and, to a lesser extent, by Giovanni Battista Carboni's guide of 1760. It is notable, however, that information about local Renaissance sculptors is absent from Carboni's Notizie istoriche delli pittori, scultori e architetti bresciani.

=== Zamboni's research and the revival of Cairano's name ===
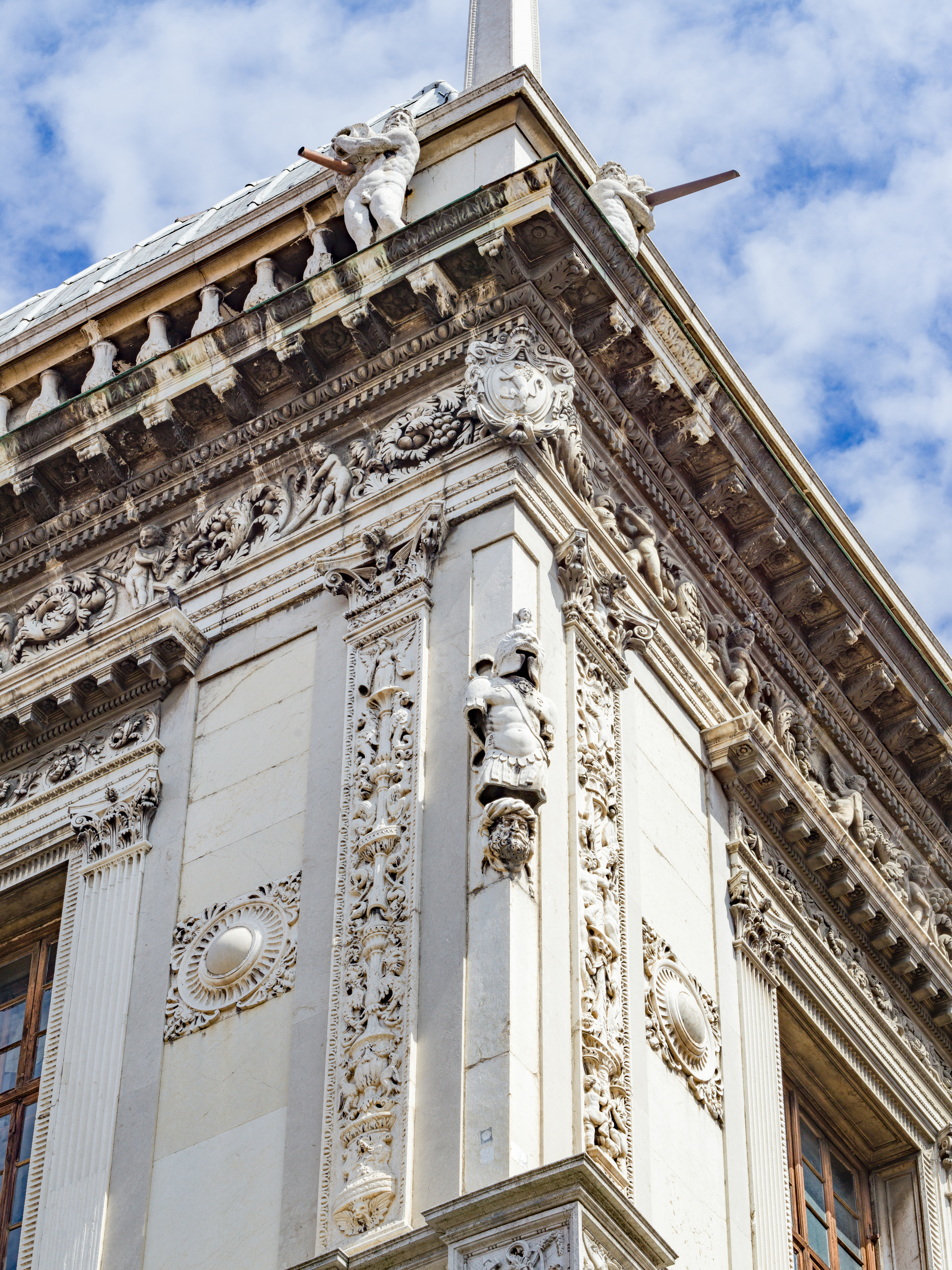
Detail of the sculptures and architectural elements of the Brescian Loggia (1495-1505).

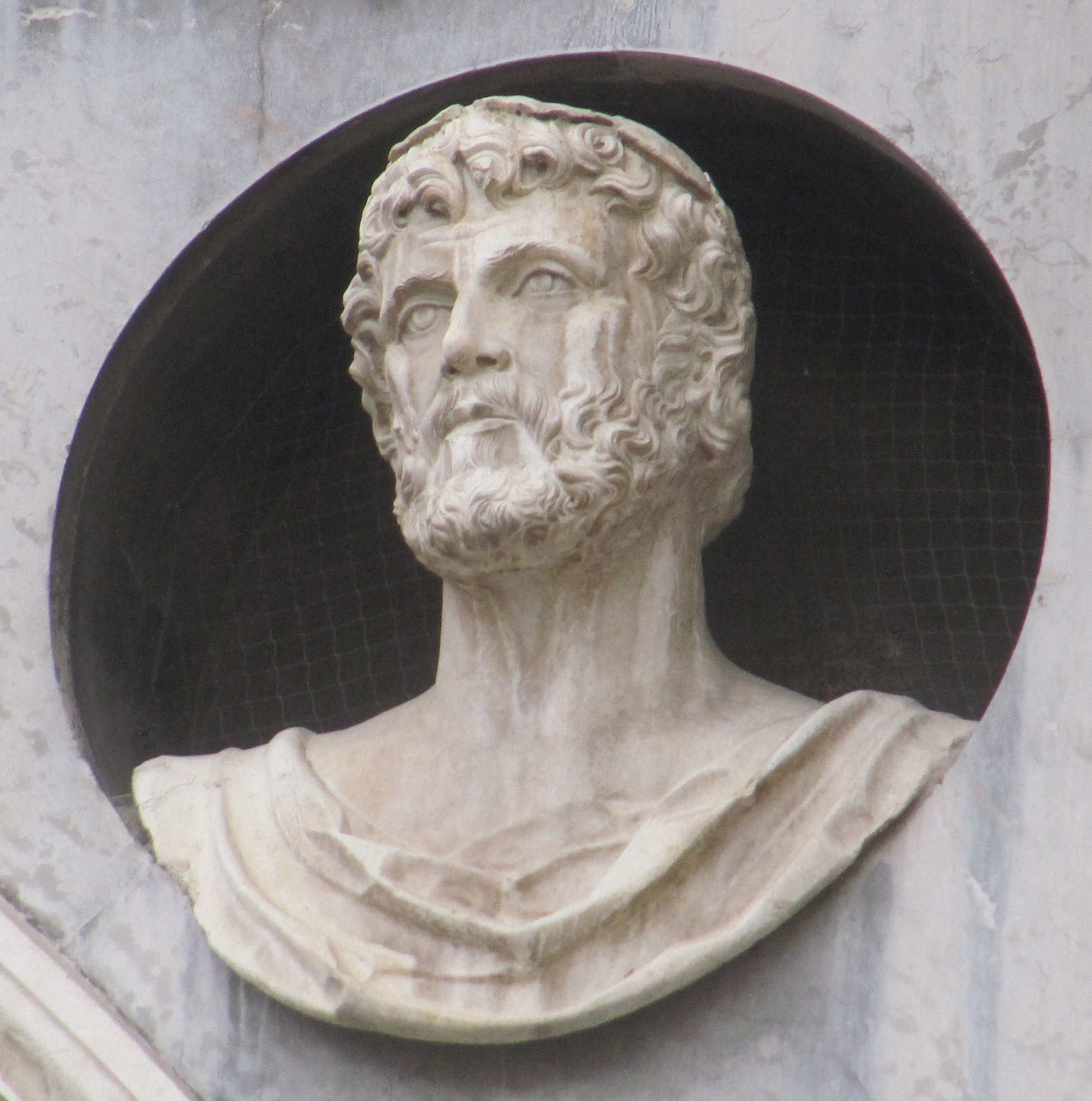
Gasparo Cairano, Caesar (late 15th century).

From the mid-18th century, a new interest in understanding Brescian art and its protagonists, past and present, began to emerge, encouraged by the cultural maturation of historical studies. Moreover, during the same period, the Loggia underwent a revitalization plan that led to the renovation of the square and the erection of a new roof by Luigi Vanvitelli, which remained unfinished. This reawakened Brescia's civic pride, naturally centered around the municipal palace. It was in this new climate that Baldassarre Zamboni's Memoirs were published in 1778, financed by the city. Zamboni's work represents the first historical research in the modern sense undertaken by the Brescian literary scene, constructed through consultation, examination, and rearrangement of documents, comparison of sources with historiography, and material evidence. Approaching the problem from this perspective and with these assumptions, Zamboni transcribed and published a vast amount of information, drawing primarily from the still extant Provvisioni comunali but especially from the lost and previously unknown bulletin books of the Municipality of Brescia. He outlined for the first time not only the real chronology but also the names of all the protagonists of a forgotten historical phase. And so, finally:

The imperial heads, as far as I can tell from the city bulletins, were almost all made by two hands. Gasparo da Milano made twenty-one, and Antonio della Porta six.

— Baldassarre Zamboni, Memorie intorno alle pubbliche fabbriche più insigni della città di Brescia, p. 44.

The importance of Baldassarre Zamboni's research lies precisely in transcribing these documents, which are now lost. However, the vast amount of data collected allowed him to compile only a very selective synthesis, which nevertheless remains the sole surviving evidence of the facts and names reported therein. The scholar's revolutionary discoveries were immediately adopted by Italian and transalpine literature. Zamboni also studied the Church of Santa Maria dei Miracoli but limited himself to consulting only the municipal archives, which did not hold the account books kept in the church's own archives. The recovered documents thus led him to date the facade's construction to 1557, superimposed on a "chapel built in a tumultuous and extremely rapid manner" around 1488. Consequently, a valuable opportunity was missed to transcribe information about this other structure, information that would be lost a century later.

=== Resumption of the Vasarian misunderstanding ===
The new discoveries made in Brescia, however, were far from restoring the works and names of the Brescian Renaissance to the recognition of art literature. A new and lengthy chapter of errors and misunderstandings was about to begin. In 1774, the Notizie istoriche de pittori, scultori ed architetti cremonesi by Giovanni Battista Zaist was published. Dealing with Gaspare Pedoni, the author went to Brescia seeking confirmation of Vasari's citation. Thus, the facade of the Sanctuary of the Miracles was attributed entirely to Pedoni's chisel, since: "it seems that this work corresponds to the others of his that we have here in Cremona, and was made by him at about the same time, as Giorgio Vasari says". Zaist's attribution profoundly affected the art literature not only in Cremona but also in Brescia, partly because it was necessary to fill the gap left regarding the work's authorship.

The 18th century concluded with a comprehensive view of the Brescian Renaissance sculptural landscape that, while more advanced than before, was marked by critical dissonance. Zamboni had returned the authorship of the Loggia sculptures to Gasparo Cairano (as their main creator) and the other collaborating artists, while the Vasarian error, revived by Zaist's unfounded attribution, still affected the Sanctuary of the Miracles.

=== Nineteenth-century guides and studies ===
Portrait of Leopoldo Cicognara.

The nineteenth-century critical analyses began with Leopoldo Cicognara's Storia della scultura (History of Sculpture), particularly the second volume published in 1816, which contains a chapter on Lombard artists. After discussing Gaspare Pedoni's activities in Cremona, Cicognara moves to Brescia and states:

The other celebrated ornamentalist and sculptor Cristoforo Pedoni, probably the son of the aforementioned one, worked in Brescia on the elegant vestibule of the Madonna dei Miracoli.

— Leopoldo Cicognara, Storia della scultura, p. 186.

The historian's attribution contains numerous oddities: firstly, it is unclear why he attributes the Brescian facade to Cristoforo Pedoni, Gaspare's son, who might not even have been born at the time. More importantly, this is the sole mention of the Brescian Renaissance period. Pomponius Gauricus, Michiel, and even Baldassarre Zamboni's discoveries are ignored. The situation becomes paradoxical when, one hundred and fifty pages later, Cicognara not only shows familiarity with Zamboni but, after praising him for the meticulousness with which he studied the Brescian archives, states:

He [Baldassarre Zamboni] enumerates about fifty sculptors for the pilasters [...] and other ornaments of the great hall known as the Public Palace in the Loggia, built after the mid-1500s, and indicates the most detailed circumstances, the agreements made, and the prices of each work, where the names of distinguished artists are preserved, as seen in the lavish compensation received, distinguishing among them Antonio Maria Colla from Padua and Ludovico Ranzi from Ferrara.

— Leopoldo Cicognara, Storia della scultura, pp. 349-350.

Cicognara extracts from Zamboni, whom he demonstrates knowing in detail, only dates and names concerning the Loggia's construction in the late 16th century. Inexplicably, he omits all data regarding the 15th-century phase. Furthermore, immediately after mentioning the two foreign sculptors, the historian places the well-known Giacomo Medici alongside them, deriving this again from Giorgio Vasari, thus completing a reconstruction that manages to be both based on recent sources yet erroneous and misleading. (Note: Zani (2010, p. 57). For further consideration of Cicognara's actual ability to reconstruct the identity of Gasparo Cairano see Zani (2010, p. 56 n. 113.))

In 1826, Paolo Brognoli, an art scholar and collector, published the first 19th-century guide to Brescia. To ensure correct attribution and dating of the discussed works, the scholar undertook archival research that led him, for the first time, to elaborate precise stylistic considerations. He appreciated the Martinengo Mausoleum, confessing that "I have not been able to ascertain the skilled artists of these works." For the Ark of St. Apollonius, he conducted thorough research in the municipal archives, allowing partial reconstruction of the commission circumstances, but was unable to find "the contract with the sculptor who worked on this ark [...], being particularly interested because I also possessed in my rooms a sculpture made by the same chisel in 1494," "with the inscription commemorating Luigi Caprioli." Brognoli is referring to none other than the Caprioli Adoration, which he consciously linked for the first time to another work by Gasparo Cairano, based purely on stylistic considerations without recourse to previous literary sources.

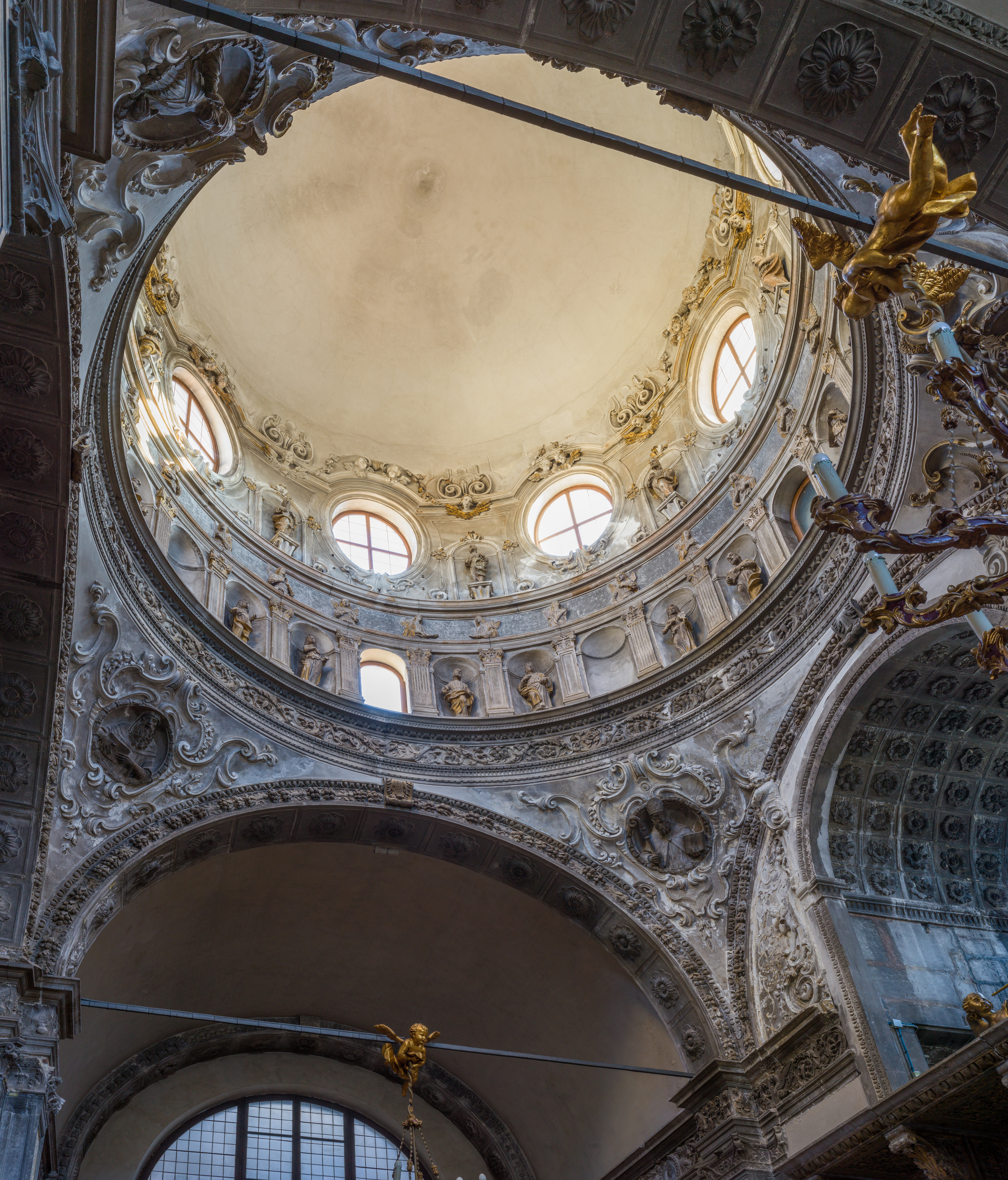
The dome of the church of Santa Maria dei Miracoli with Gasparo Cairano's cycle of Apostles and Antonio della Porta's cycle of Angels (1489).

Church of Santa Maria dei Miracoli, interior (last decade of the 15th century).

Soon after the publication of Brognoli's guide, the Athenaeum of Brescia commissioned Alessandro Sala to write a new guide, published in 1834. According to the author, the work was intended as a practical aid for tourists, without particular claims to depth. Sala, needing to provide information about the facade of Santa Maria dei Miracoli, consulted, perhaps for the first time, the church archives, extracting names and facts but presenting them with extreme brevity. Nevertheless, Sala's information was very important:

We do not know who were the sculptors of the beautiful candelabra on the facade, nor who, among the many artists mentioned, were the authors of the various marble works inside this sanctuary. The only thing we know is that the four doctors on the cornices of the first dome were made by Antonio della Porta, who also made the two hermits Anthony and Paul in low relief; and that the angels on the cornice of the same dome, above which Gaspare da Cairano placed the twelve apostles he carved in marble, were made by him.

— Alessandro Sala, Pitture ed altri oggetti di belle arti in Brescia, p. 90.

Sala then acknowledges the existence of certain "books about the building" and reports that many artists are named in them, though the executed works are not precisely attributed. It is not stated explicitly, but it is clear that, based on the same sources, he is also able to write that "the first architect of this temple was a certain Maestro Jacopo". (Note: Brognoli (1826, p. 89). Italics are also in Sala's writing, indicating a copy from the original source consulted.) This is very important and unique information from a literary perspective. The guide's style, however, leads Sala not only to omit any dating but also to formulate no stylistic connection with the documented and identically named Gasparo da Milano and Antonio della Porta who worked on the Loggia. Nor does he notice the onomastic coincidence between the mentioned Maestro Jacopo and Jacopo da Verona, who, according to Zamboni, also worked on the Loggia. Thus, another opportunity for clarification is lost, one which could have been based, among other things, on the "books of the building" of Santa Maria dei Miracoli.

Consequently, subsequent bibliography paid little attention to Sala's findings, or rather, did not replace the established artistic literature with Sala's insubstantial report. Instead, the existing literature remained the reference point, merely supplemented with the names proposed by the Brescian scholar. In fact, Sala initiated the tendency to critically separate the sanctuary's facade from the sculptures inside. The passage regarding the Church of the Miracles in Federico Odorici's 1853 guide to Brescia is emblematic in this respect:

Even if Sala's researches to identify the author of the beautiful marble candelabra of this facade were in vain, we discovered from a work by Picenardi (Note: Picenardi (1820, p. 94). This author, not named in the present discussion, had inferred from Zaist the Brescian attributions of Pedoni for the composition of his guide to Cremona. See also Zani (2010, p. 55 n. 110.)) that it was Gian Gaspare Pedoni. Inside, there are sculptures by Antonio della Porta and Gaspare da Cairano; but it is not easy to identify the authors of each piece among the many different styles.

— Federico Odorici, Storie bresciane dai primi tempi fino all'età nostra narrate da Federico Odorici, pp. 99-100.

In this complex, albeit partially correct, attributive confusion, only Pedoni's name remained truly celebrated. Odorici appreciated the facade's antique-style ornamentation much more than the interior statues, which were merely named along with their authors. The decorations of the Loggia, the Ark of St. Apollonius, and the Martinengo Mausoleum, praised solely for their formal value, were not subject to any stylistic or attributive assumptions.

=== Renaissance enthusiasm in post-unification Brescia ===
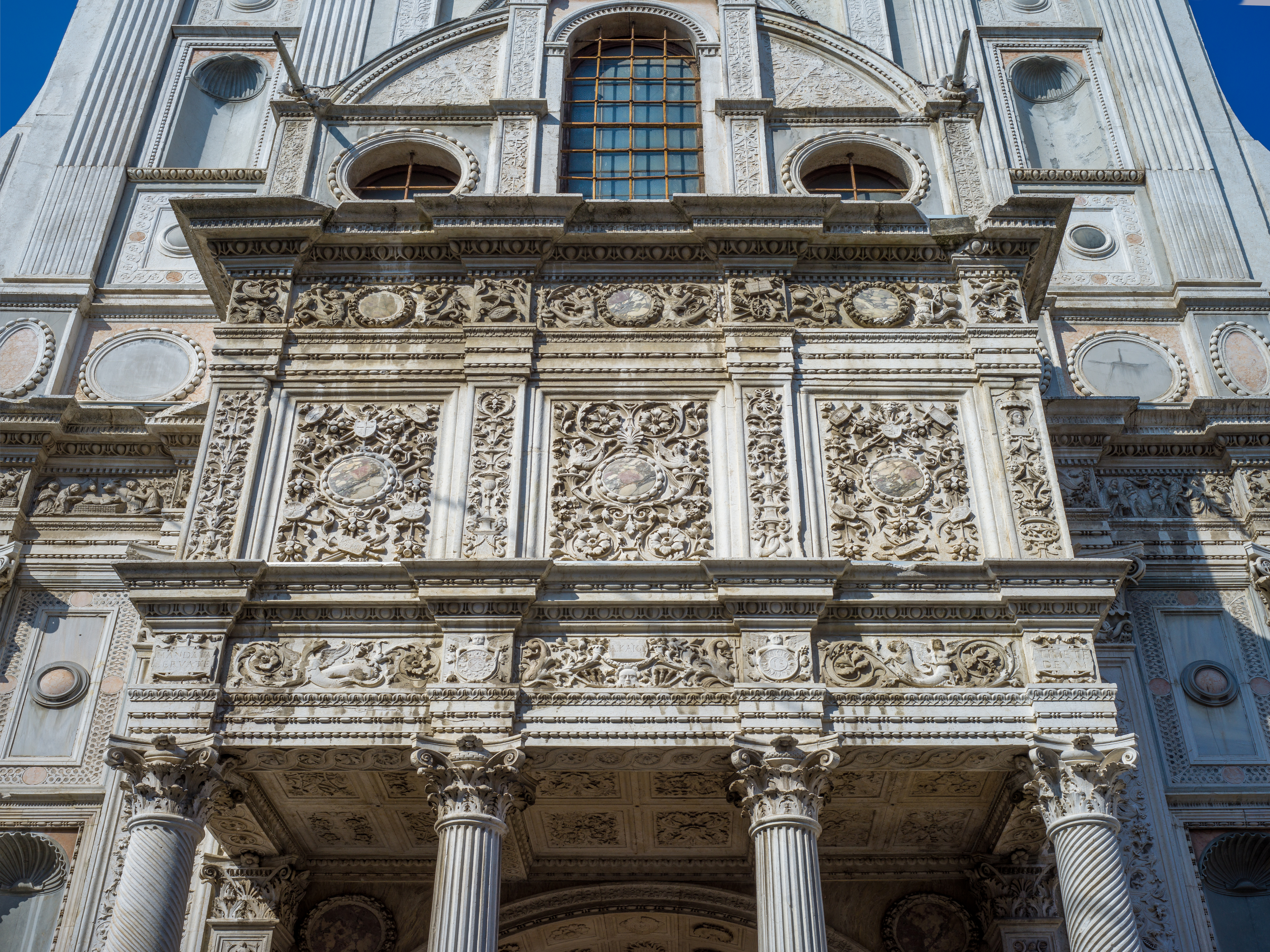
Church of Santa Maria dei Miracoli, facade (late 15th century).

The Unification of Italy, as for other Italian cities, also marked for Brescia the beginning of a new era of institutions in charge of protecting the artistic and monumental heritage, as well as enhancing it through targeted restoration, recovery, or sometimes destruction of what was deemed unworthy of preservation. (Note: Treccani (1988, p. 27). In 1862 a municipal study commission was appointed to restore the Loggia, which was damaged during the Austrian bombardment of the Ten Days of Brescia (see Treccani (1988, p. 62.)), with a clear rejection to the preservation of Luigi Vanvitelli's unfinished attic. Similarly, the commission's preference for Renaissance relics diverted its interest to the façade of Santa Maria dei Miracoli, while in 1863 the same commission recommended the demolition of the church of San Domenico, since in view of its seventeenth-century architecture "it would certainly be said to be a shame to preserve it" (see Treccani (1988, p. 35.)) However, the renewed enthusiasm for the Brescian Renaissance on all fronts was not accompanied by a parallel development of knowledge about its main protagonists. Preceded by a quotation from Cocchetti in 1859, the sculptor Maffeo Olivieri appears for the first time in Brescian art literature in Stefano Fenaroli's Dictionary of Brescian Artists of 1877. Fenaroli, based on the style of the two bronze candlesticks in the St. Mark's Basilica in Venice, also attributes the medallions of the Martinengo Mausoleum to Olivieri.

This early critical openness to the works of the Brescian Renaissance was to have strong repercussions in the early 20th century. Fenaroli's dictionary was a cornerstone of the knowledge of Brescian art history: for the first time, documentary research was carried out in the municipal archives, deepening what had already been found by Zamboni, with discoveries of fundamental importance for artists such as Moretto, Romanino, Floriano Ferramola, Stefano Lamberti and others, reported discursively in the first section of the dictionary. After a section devoted to documents, the volume closes with an appendix that schematically lists "the names of Brescian artists whose works are unknown". In the face of such an extensive literary work, the absence of Gasparo Cairano, Tamagnino, and any personality in the field of sculpture at the time is surprising. Gasparo da Milano is not mentioned anywhere, not even among the unknown artists, although there are known archival documents that mention his name. (Note: For some speculation on the reason for these omissions see Zani (2010, p. 64 n. 159.))

This absence of names and facts of the Brescian Renaissance sculpture is relentlessly repeated in a series of later texts. Andrea Cassa, in his Appunti su alcuni monumenti bresciani, including Santa Maria dei Miracoli and the Loggia, shows that he had consulted the Sanctuary's archives, but fails to mention either Gasparo Cairano or Tamagnino, instead praising Giovanni Gaspare Pedoni for the work done on the façade. Incidentally, not finding Pedoni's name in the Sanctuary's archives, information that would have supported his thesis, Cassa falsifies his own source, namely Baldassarre Zamboni's text, saying that the latter had found the name of Gaspare Pedoni in the Loggia's archives, whereas the only Pedoni mentioned by the scholar is his son Cristoforo Pedoni, who worked on some parts of the upper cornice in the second half of the 16th century. But even Giuseppe Merzario, in his text I maestri comacini of 1893, does not doubt to identify Gaspare Pedoni as the Gasparo of the Brescian documents, confirming him as the protagonist of the Brescian sculpture of that period.

=== Luigi Arcioni and the first critical about-face ===
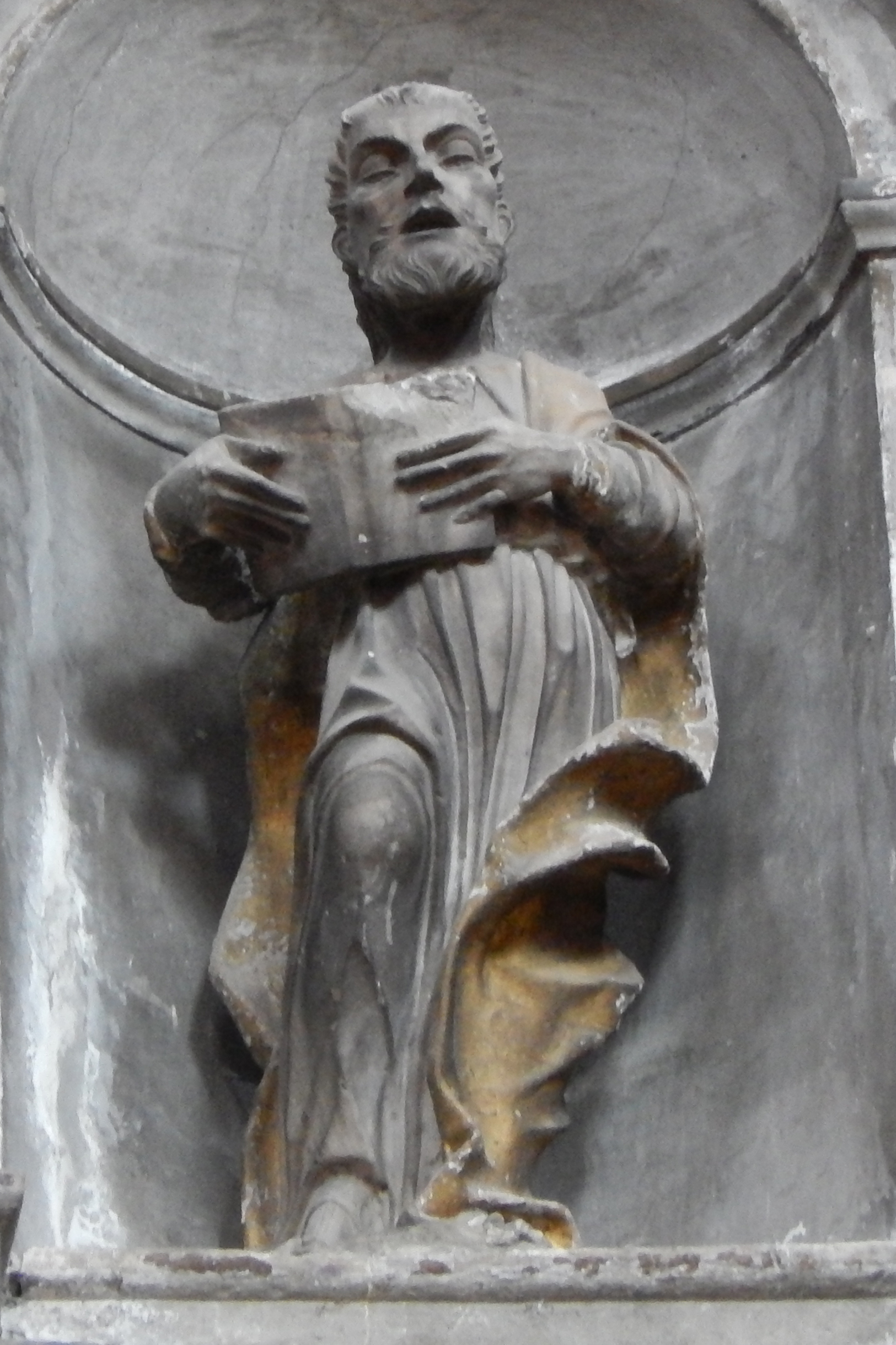
Gasparo Cairano, Apostle (1489).

It was up to the architect Luigi Arcioni to bring order to this chaotic panorama, to debunk the myths and give due weight to the certainties. Arcioni's contributions, published in part in a series of articles between 1896 and 1897, concern the Loggia and the Sanctuary of the Miracles, the two monuments whose restoration was of interest to the Municipal Commission for the Preservation of Monuments, of which Arcioni was a member. The scholar collected reliable sources and excluded everything that could not be verified or, in some cases, refuted. The first article on the historiography of the Sanctuary of the Miracles, published in 1896, already had important results: it mentioned Gasparo Cairano, Antonio della Porta, Giovanni and Cristoforo dell'Ostello, noting their presence also in the construction site of the Loggia. On the other hand, he excluded Gaspare Pedoni as the author of the façade, not only because his name does not appear in the documents, but also, for the first time, on the basis of stylistic comparisons with his known works in Cremona. However, with a correct interpretation of the archival sources, he refrained from attributing it to Gasparo Cairano or Antonio della Porta, who were mentioned as figure painters and not as decorators. He also recognized them as the same authors of the Caesar cycle on the fronts of the loggia and appreciated their artistic evolution:

Gaspare da Cairano and Antonio della Porta, authors of the apostles, angels and doctors of the first dome, and most probably of the other sculptures among the capitals of the facade, and those of the choir, a few years later are called upon to make the imperial busts of our Loggia palace. And it is an interesting and beautiful fact to observe the progress of these craftsmen toward the new ideal of art.

— Valerio Terraroli, Luigi Arcioni. Progetti e restauri a Brescia tra Ottocento e Novecento, pp. 215-216.

For the first time in art literature, he united Antonio della Porta and the sculptor surnamed Tamagnino into a single artistic personality and linked the hitherto ignored Master Jacopo found by Alessandro Sala with the Jacopo da Verona mentioned in the Loggia documents.

While Luigi Arcioni published his important findings on Brescian Renaissance sculpture, the Milanese lecturer Alfredo Melani published in 1899 in "Arte e Storia" an article on the Martinengo Mausoleum in which attributions were made with some conviction without any documentary or bibliographical support:

Stefano Lamberti for the design and Giacomo Faustinetti for the execution. And since the monument is adorned with bronze medallions and bas-reliefs, their casting is attributed to Andrea Baruzzi, another Brescian artist.

— Alfredo Melani, Il monumento di Marc'Antonio Martinengo della Pallata a Brescia in "Arte e Storia", XVIII, 9-10, p. 59.

Most unlikely is the reference to Giacomo Faustinetti, who was more active in the 1550s. Instead, as the architect of the Church of Miracles, he goes so far as to mention a non-existent "Jacopo del Sala", saying that he was taken from the studies of Luigi Arcioni, while the latter does mention a "Jacopo del Sala" in his writings, but trivially in reference to the Master Jacopo found by Alessandro Sala in 1834.

=== Meyer: Cairano returns to the critical scene ===
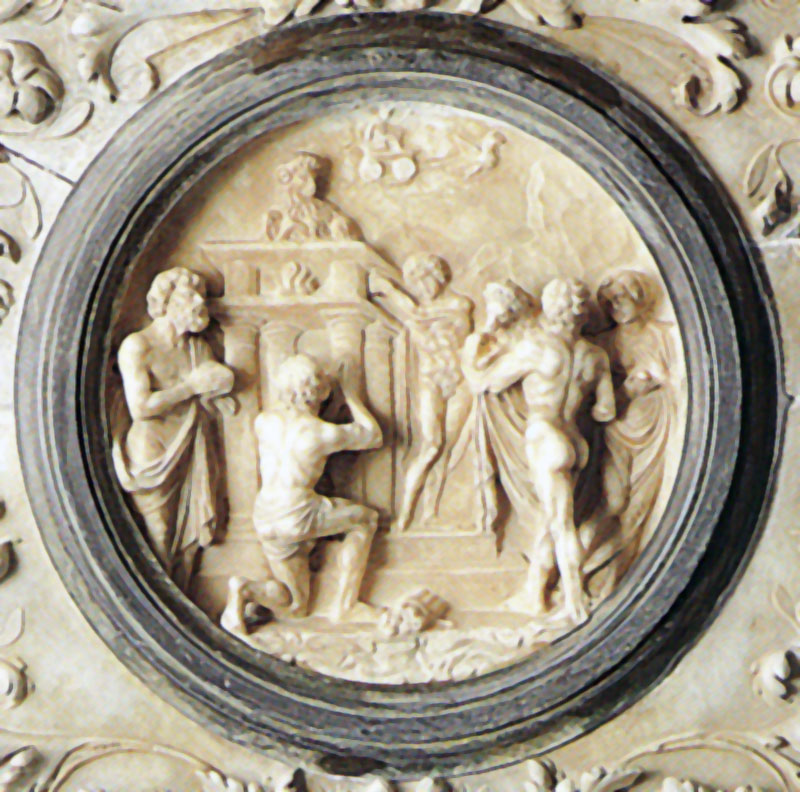
Gasparo Cairano, Martinengo Mausoleum, Scene of Sacrifice (post-1510).

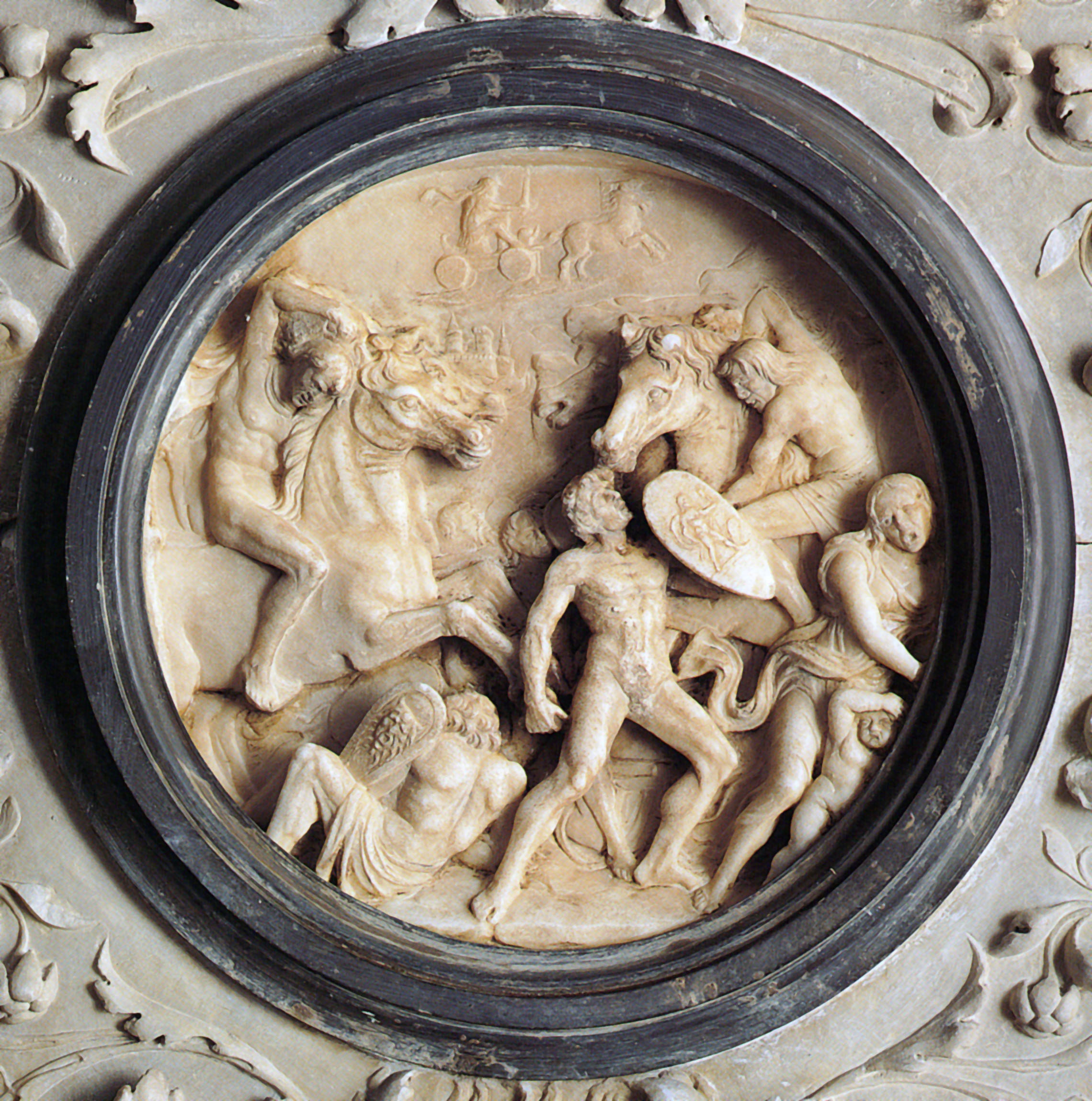
Gasparo Cairano, Martinengo Mausoleum, Battle Scene (post 1510).

The first significant turning point for the historiography of Brescian Renaissance sculpture is the second volume of Alfred Gotthold Meyer's Oberitalienische Frührenaissance, published in Berlin in 1900: the text devotes an entire chapter to Brescian sculpture and architecture, identifying them for the first time as a specific critical case to be treated separately from the broader Lombard context, with a detailed analysis of works and bibliography, including local ones. However, the scholar made several dating and attribution errors, as well as some omissions, all due to the influence of contemporary art literature. First, Meyer revisits Pomponius Gauricus' and Zamboni's "Gaspar mediolanensis" and separates him from the Gaspare Pedoni cited by Vasari, which he nevertheless takes into account. Drawing his own conclusions from the various documents published locally, from Sala to Arcioni, he then divides the Brescian school into two different operational sectors of decorators and figure painters: he places Gaspare Pedoni and Stefano Lamberti at the head of the first category, and Gasparo Cairano and Antonio della Porta at the head of the second.

Declaring a definite preference for Gasparo Cairano, Meyer proceeds to reconstruct a catalog of works, both known and presumed, each placed in a specific context of precise Lombard artistic references: to the documented Apostles of the Sanctuary of the Miracles and the Caesars of the Loggia he adds the ark of St. Apollonius, the Caprioli Adoration and the altar of St. Jerome in St. Francis, recognizing for the first time their originality in the cylindrical transposition of Mantegna's Brawl of the Sea Gods. Meyer also assumes Gasparo's participation in the Martinengo Mausoleum, but the long-standing misunderstanding about the dating of the monument, then dated between 1526 and 1530, leads the scholar to attribute it almost entirely to Stefano Lamberti, whom he also sees as the author, along with Pedoni, of the ornaments on the facade of Santa Maria dei Miracoli. The text, as already mentioned, omits important works such as the reliefs of San Pietro in Oliveto and, above all, the portal of the Cathedral of Salò, which the German scholar may not have known.

However, the critical oblivion of the historiography of Brescian Renaissance sculpture and of the figure of Gasparo Cairano, an artist who by then had become increasingly important, must also have been caused by Meyer's original reconstruction: the redaction in archaic German severely limited the dissemination of the text, which in fact had little success in Brescia, to the point of being ignored.

In the first thirty years of the twentieth century, Meyer's text and other Brescian sources had quite different effects on the critics who dealt with the subject, according to different interpretations. Francesco Malaguzzi Valeri, in his 1904 monograph on Giovanni Antonio Amadeo, was one of the first to take into account the German scholar's contribution, although he only dealt with the Brescian question in a brief and hasty passage. The volume dedicated to Brescia in the series "Artistic Italy", edited by Antonio Ugoletti in 1909, focused mainly on the Loggia and Santa Maria dei Miracoli, based on selected documents. Perhaps for the first time in several centuries, there is no mention of Gaspare Pedoni, a significant fact since it is a text with a touristic and popular appeal. On the other hand, Giorgio Nicodemi's Guide to Brescia, published in the early 1920s, presents a highly disorganized and fragmentary picture of Brescian Renaissance sculpture, making very general stylistic comparisons and never referring to Gasparo Cairano, Tamagnino, or any other documented sculptor of the period. (Note: Nicodemi (1920, pp. 24, 32, 67, 52–53). Nicodemi sees in the Caprioli Adoration "sculptures by Amadeo," while in the ark of St. Apollonius he finds "vivid points of contact with some sculptures by Agostino Busti known as Bambaia." On the other hand, he does not make any attribution for the Martinengo Mausoleum, while speaking of the sanctuary of the Miracles he avoids naming the cycles of Angels and Apostles inside, with their authors. See also Zani (2010, p. 77 n. 245.)) Especially when compared to the artistic literature of his contemporaries, which approached the Brescian question in a different way, the overall result is superficial.

Giorgio Nicodemi's lack of interest in Brescian Renaissance sculpture in this work is even more evident in his 1925 monograph on Bambaia, where he mentions the two statuettes of Virtue and attributes them to this sculptor without noticing that they are almost identical to the figures on the Ark of St. Apollonius. On the other hand, Adolfo Venturi, in his History of Italian Art of 1924, treats the Loggia and the Sanctuary of the Miracles exclusively as a matter of late fifteenth-century architecture, without a word about the sculptures, while Silvio Vigezzi, in his The Lombard Sculpture of the Sixteenth Century of 1929, reports that the façade of the Sanctuary of the Miracles was chiselled by Gaspare Pedoni, to whom he also attributes, without any documentary source or significant stylistic comparison, the Ark of St. Apollonius, the tomb of Niccolò Orsini and the Martinengo Mausoleum.

=== The archival research of Paolo Guerrini ===
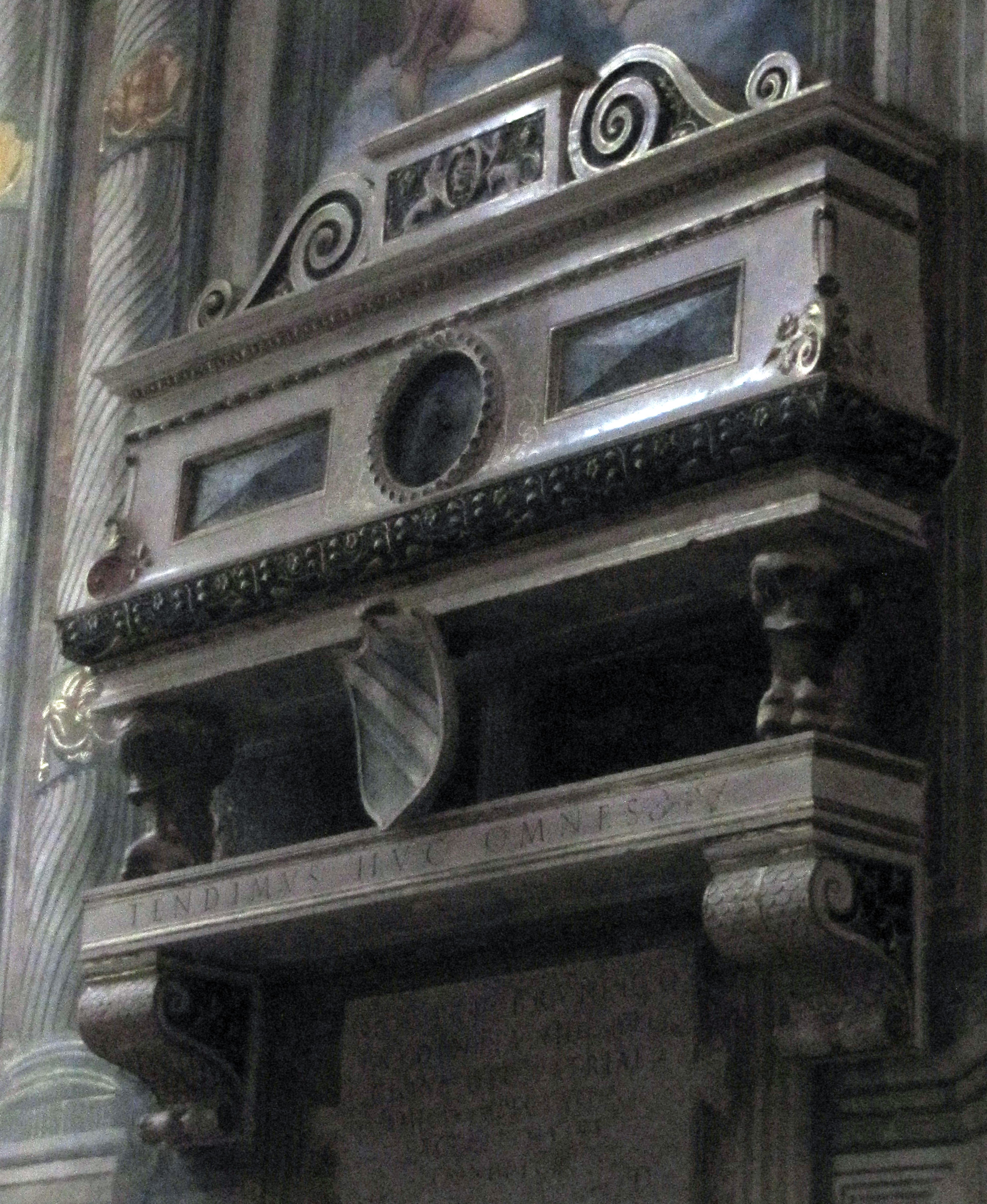
Gasparo Cairano, Tomb of Gaspare Brunelli (1500).

In 1930, Paolo Guerrini, the most important Brescian scholar of the first half of the 20th century, published in the first volume of the Historical Memoirs of the Diocese of Brescia the contents of a series of documents of fundamental importance for the historiography of Brescian Renaissance sculpture. First of all, he reports some invoices for some sculptural works done in Santa Maria dei Miracoli in 1493, which the scholar found in the Brunelli family archives, where they were located thanks to Gaspare Brunelli's role as functionary for the construction of the church. After analyzing these bills, Guerrini published the contents of the Martinengo Mausoleum, which he found in the archives of Santa Maria dei Miracoli: the document, now lost and published exclusively in Guerrini's text, which is why it is so important, is a copy of various accounting data concerning the construction of the Sanctuary, including payments to Cairano and Antonio della Porta for the two cycles of statues inside. Paolo Guerrini's contribution thus provides reliable contemporary documents on which to base the dates and attributions of the Sanctuary's sculptures, and is the only one of its kind, apart from the information provided by Sala a century earlier.

In addition, the Brunelli family archives had already allowed Paolo Guerrini in 1926 to discover a document mentioning "M. Gaspare da Milano", whom the scholar believed to be Pedoni, as the author of the Gaspare Brunelli's funeral monument in San Francesco, adding yet another missing piece to Gasparo's historiography. Almost in parallel with Guerrini's archival investigations, other discoveries increased the sculptor's catalog. In 1920, Luigi Rivetti published for the first time the contract between "Gasparem de Cayrano de Mediolano lapicida architectum et ingeniarum optimum" and representatives of the municipality of Chiari, in the Brescia area, for the construction of the portal of the city's cathedral, while in 1932 Anton Maria Mucchi published the archival documents relating to the commission and execution of the portal of the Cathedral of Salò, in which the name of "Gasparo da Milano" reappears: by this time, his name was well known to the critics, and his catalog, as well as his artistic abilities, were gradually gaining depth.

=== The big misunderstanding of the twentieth century: Maffeo Olivieri ===
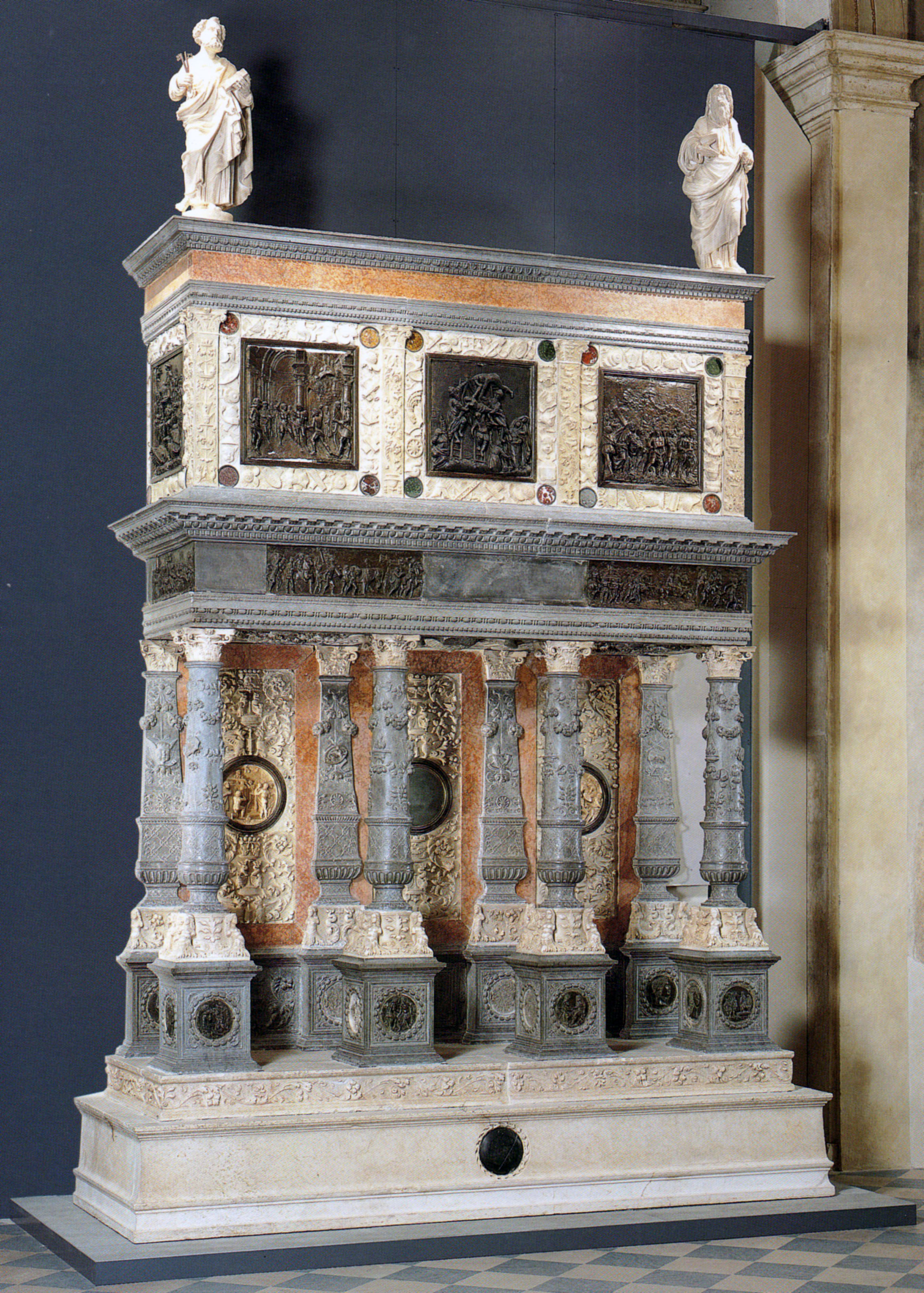
Martinengo Mausoleum (1503-1518).

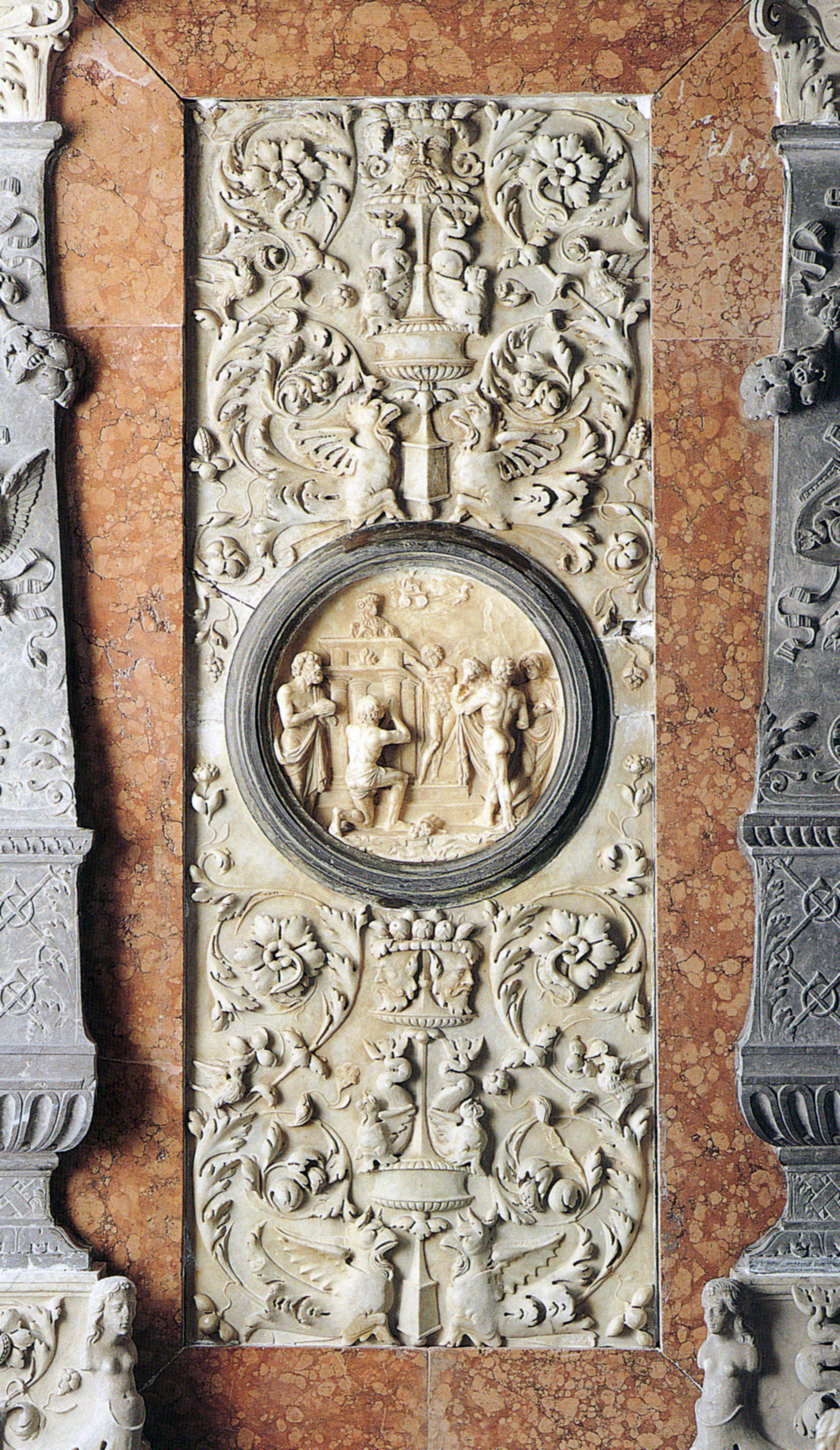
Detail of the Martinengo Mausoleum (first decade of the 16th century).

Absent from any literary source of the time, either edited or in manuscript, Maffeo Olivieri's name first appeared in art literature in 1847, when his signature was noted by Pietro Selvatico on the two bronze candlesticks in the St. Mark's Basilica in Venice. The scholar rightly lamented the impossibility of finding information about this sculptor. Thirty years later, as already mentioned, Stefano Fenaroli revealed how Maffeo Olivieri was actually mentioned in the Brescian register of 1534 and hypothesized his authorship on the bronzes of the Martinengo Mausoleum, a proposal that remained without follow-up. Bode and Planiscig, in their extensive studies of early 20th-century bronzes, attributed a number of statuettes to him, while Hill, in 1930, identified him as the "Master of 1523," author of a series of medals. Remaining initially unknown to international critics, on the other hand, Giuseppe Papaleoni's discovery, published in Trent in 1890, that Maffeo Olivieri was also the author of the elaborate wooden altarpiece of the Assumption in Condino, as evidenced by the contract dated 1538.

Knowledge of Olivieri at the beginning of the 20th century, before he became the protagonist of Brescian Renaissance sculpture, was limited. Antonio Morassi, in an article published in 1936, was the first to mention the talents of this artist, who was obviously very versatile but who was absent from the sources of the time. The scholar, convinced that he was in the presence of an extremely important and undiscovered author, went to Brescia in search of important works that such a personality must have left behind. Therefore:

I was thus going around the churches of the Brescian area and Brescia, where he had kept his workshop and whence he perhaps never for a long time moved, always in search of my author; and I was already despairing, proving fruitless even some archival investigation, of tracing his footsteps, when it occurred to me to visit the Christian Museum, in the deconsecrated church of Santa Giulia. [...] I stopped my attention on that distinguished masterpiece of Brescian sculpture that is the mausoleum of General Marc'Antonio Martinengo. I observed [...] the strange flavor of that style in which Gothic substrata, mixed with Baroque features, emerge, which is proper to the decorative art of Brescia in the sixteenth century. And I was thinking about the architectural relations of the monument with the portal of Santa Maria dei Miracoli, catching in it some leading threads that well clarify its northern origins, when, as I approached to examine the bronze medallions embedded in the plinths, I had the sensation that I was facing creations of the master I was researching. The resemblance, indeed, the partial identity, of these figures with those seated in the niches of the Venetian candlesticks, which had well remained in my eyes, gave me the confidence that I had come, at last, to a good port. [...] Probably the bronze square panels of the sarcophagus, as well as the triumphal frieze in which the stylistic affinity to Condino's figures was evident, must also have belonged to him. Instead, I was left with some uncertainty about the possible attribution to Maffeo of the marble part.

— Antonio Morassi, Per la ricostruzione di Maffeo Olivieri in "Bollettino d'Arte", year XXX, 6, December 1936, pp. 243-245.

At this point in the article, Morassi was already convinced of Olivieri's authorship of the bronzes in the Martinengo Mausoleum, while he still had doubts about the marble part, doubts that would be resolved later in the same article by purely deductive means. Morassi was also affected by the misunderstanding about the dating of the monument, which is generally linked to the funeral of General Marcantonio Martinengo, who died in 1526, which helps the scholar to compare it with the Venetian candlesticks dated 1527. Morassi also misunderstood Stefano Fenaroli's proposal to attribute the bronzes of the Mausoleum to Olivieri, claiming that the Brescian scholar must have deduced their names from the documents of the time, when this was clearly not possible, since in that case Fenaroli would not have hesitated to include them in the documentary appendix of his dictionary. After comparing the arks of St. Apollonius and St. Titian, Morassi proceeded to reconstruct the cultural context in which Olivieri must have been trained:

Who were his masters in the plastic arts? It is difficult to say. The relationship between his art and the pictorial atmosphere is obvious. We will come back to that. On the other hand, there are no names of Brescian sculptors who could shed some light on our artist. It is not known that Brescia had important sculptors around 1500, when Maffeo's training could have taken place. Nor is it likely that they existed there, since for the most important work of the period, the plastic decoration of the Church of the Miracles, woodcarvers from Como, with somewhat confused stylistic tendencies, came to Brescia [...]. The facade of the Miracles, with its fine work of bas-reliefs [...], therefore constituted, and certainly constituted for Olivieri, a model of the first order. [...] But if Olivieri's architectural and decorative sense (also in the Venetian candlesticks, as well as in the Martinengo Mausoleum) is clearly Lombard, the same cannot be said of the figural parts. The broad, soft, animated treatment of his figures, often modeled with synthesis and abbreviation, presupposes the abandonment of that naturalistic trend that belongs to Amadeo and Briosco [...]. Olivieri's art developed in a most interesting phase of Brescian figurative art; and only painting can give us the key to understand it.

— Antonio Morassi, Per la ricostruzione di Maffeo Olivieri in "Bollettino d'Arte", year XXX, 6, December 1936, pp. 246-247.

The statements made by Morassi are questionable, especially in the light of the knowledge of Brescian Renaissance sculpture that was established at that time. Disregarding the documented sculptors active in Brescia at the turn of the 1500s, whose existence is even questioned, he places painting as Olivieri's only reference: there is no Pomponius Gauricus, no Baldassarre Zamboni, no Alessandro Sala, no Luigi Arcioni, no Meyer, and no Guerrini. Moreover, as already mentioned, at the end of the article, the Martinengo Mausoleum was completed under the sole name of Maffeo Olivieri, to whom Morassi literally “gave the chisel”.

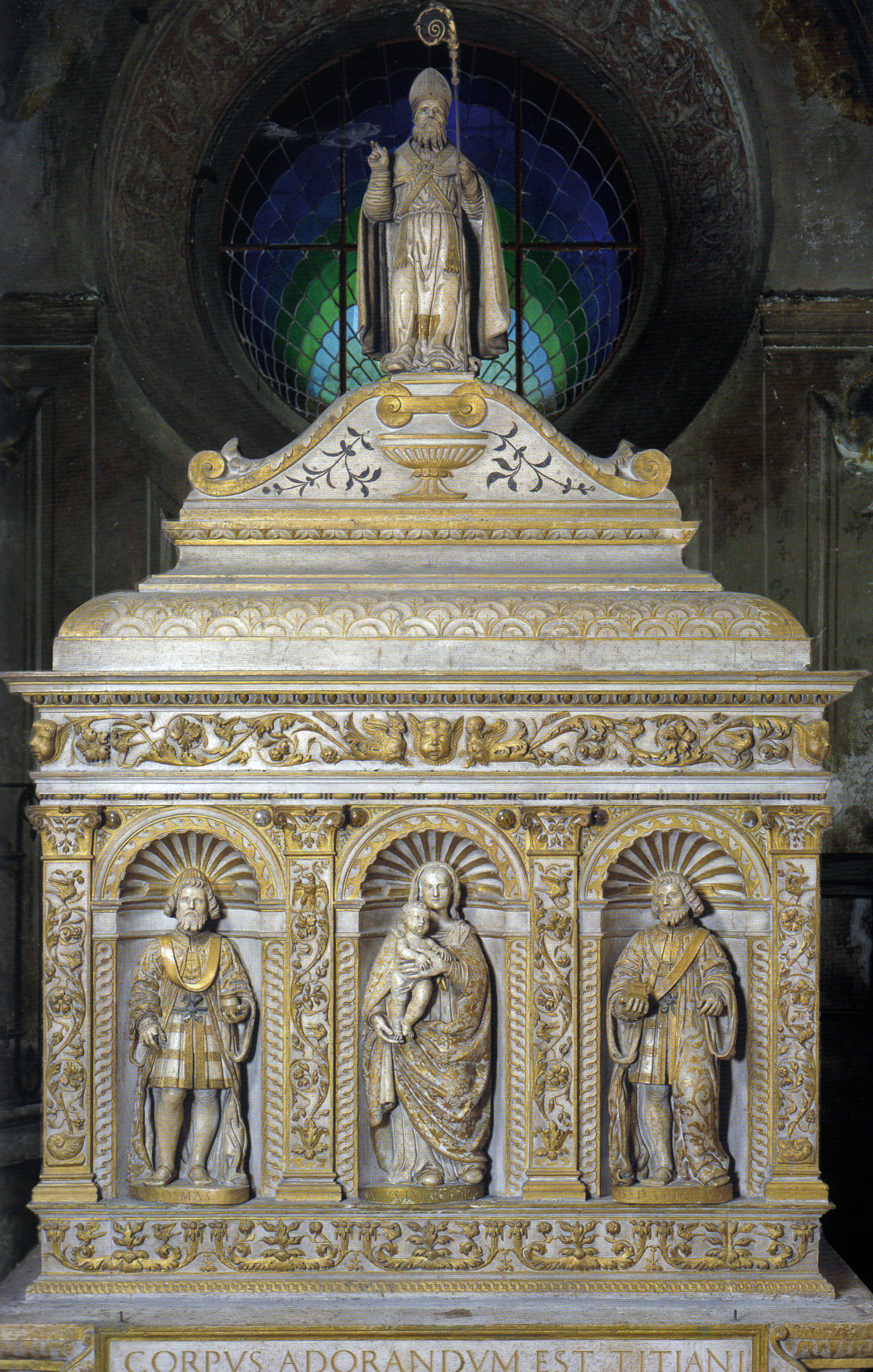
Sanmicheli workshop, ark of Saint Titian (1505).

In 1939, in the volume dedicated to Brescia in the Catalogue of Art and Antiquity in Italy, Antonio Morassi no longer had any doubts in attributing to Olivieri the title of sculptor, and therefore proceeded to define his catalog of Brescian works in marble, of much greater quantitative and qualitative proportions than the medals and the wooden altarpiece assigned up to that time. The Martinengo Mausoleum became "a most important work, certainly by Maffeo Olivieri." The ark of St. Apollonius was classified as "perhaps an early work of Maffeo Olivieri, as would be judged from the style, comparing the ark with Martinengo's funerary monument." Due to similarities with the mausoleum, the Altar of St. Jerome in San Francesco was also "probably the work of Maffeo Olivieri". On the contrary, anything that could not be attributed to Maffeo Olivieri's style would not interest Morassi, who omitted any archival sources on individual works. He questioned the involvement of Gaspare Pedoni on the façade of the Sanctuary of the Miracles, but deliberately avoided mention of Gasparo Cairano and Tamagnino, documented by Guerrini nine years earlier as the authors of more than twenty statues inside the sanctuary. Again ignoring Paolo Guerrini and the "M. Gaspare da Milano" he found, he classified the Brunelli funerary monument as a "fine work by a Brescian sculptor in the style of Lamberti," while the Caprioli Adoration was relegated to an anonymous "Brescian author of the early 1500s, a pupil of Amadeo." Finally, he panned the Ark of Saint Titian, judging it "not very good".

Antonio Morassi's reconstruction minimizes and superficializes the complex panorama of trends and artists of Brescian Renaissance sculpture, focusing on a bronze and wood sculptor turned marble master, with a catalogue of works based solely on the deductive attribution of the Martinengo Mausoleum. The consequences of Morassi's erroneous reinterpretation were very serious and had a series of repercussions in the critical field. The first to fall victim to this misunderstanding was Gaetano Panazza, who, in the 1958 catalogue of the Civic Museums of Brescia, considered Olivieri's attribution of the Martinengo Mausoleum "satisfactory". Even in the History of Brescia, published by Treccani in 1963, the opportunity to finally bring order to the historiography of the period was partially lost when Adriano Peroni, on the basis of Morassi's "well-founded critical reconstruction", left unchanged Maffeo Olivieri's catalogue and artistic role, which, moreover, was seen as a natural response to the gap concerning the artist's youth. Peroni's contribution, however, remains of the greatest cultural depth, above all because he inaugurated a critical interpretation of the sculptural works, capable of going beyond questions of attribution, to include broader themes such as the reconstruction of the humanistic context in which the great building sites of Renaissance Brescia took place. In addition to Maffeo Olivieri, Peroni was able to identify Gasparo Cairano and Tamagnino and attribute the documented works to them, although the relevance of what has been attributed to Olivieri clearly places the latter member of the trio in the foreground.

This preeminent position of Maffeo Olivieri finally fell out of favor in 1977, when Camillo Boselli, in the Regesto artistico dei notai roganti in Brescia dall'anno 1500 all'anno 1560, the result of research in the Notarial Fund of the Brescia State Archives, in addition to a partial reconstruction of the Cairano family tree, published a series of documents fundamental to the reconstruction of the commission of the Martinengo Mausoleum, starting with the 1503 contract between Bernardino delle Croci and the brothers Francesco and Antonio II Martinengo of Padernello, with other subsequent documents up to 1516. The construction of the monument was thus backdated by almost twenty years, and the attribution of the monument to Maffeo Olivieri and all the other works attributed to him by Morassi, which were based on the authorship of the mausoleum, fell. On the contrary, in the second half of the twentieth century, numerous documents from civil and ecclesiastical archives testify to Maffeo Olivieri's activity as a woodcarver, along with some works that are certainly attributed to him. The question of Maffeo Olivieri as a marble artist was finally closed in 2010 by Vito Zani who, after a long discussion, concludes:

No one seems to have ever asked why, of this supposed Brescian protagonist of marble, not a single document or work has ever been found that could give the slightest plausible indication of his activity as a stonemason.

— Vito Zani, Gasparo Cairano, p. 85.

=== 1980s-90s: Critical recognition ===
Palazzo della Loggia in Brescia.

The critical repercussions of the discoveries published by Camillo Boselli in 1977, (Note: In addition to Boselli's decisive clarification of the Martinengo Mausoleum's historiography, the scholar also pointed to documents mentioning Gasparo Cairano's previously unknown sons, who were sculptors themselves. Cf. Boselli (1977, pp. 150, 289.)) combined with existing knowledge from literature, first appeared in volumes on various subjects published in the 1980s. These included the monograph on the Sanctuary of the Miracles, edited by Antonio Fappani and Luciano Anelli in 1989, and Father Stipi's monograph on San Pietro in Oliveto in 1985. More specific in this regard is Valerio Terraroli's 1987 monograph on the two cathedrals of Brescia, which provided an opportunity for a new critical reinterpretation of the Ark of St. Apollonius.

Based on the proceedings of the conference on Piazza della Loggia held by Ida Gianfranceschi in 1986, a large three-volume monograph on the Loggia and its square was published between 1993 and 1995. It includes an essay by Giovanni Agosti specifically on the Caesars cycle, tracing an innovative artistic profile of Gasparo Cairano, starting from a reconsideration of Pomponius Gauricus's citation and the humanist milieu associated with the sculptor. Michiel's account of his brother Anzolino, a terracotta sculptor in Milan, was also recovered. Agosti then compiled a hypothetical catalog of Gasparo's works and, in collaboration with Alessandro Bagnoli and Roberto Bartalini, proposed a distinction in authorship of the Caesars between Cairano and Tamagnino, a distinction critically acclaimed to this day. He also reconstructed for the first time the historiography of the Caprioli Adoration, attributed, however, more prudently to an "anonymous Lombard artist of the late fifteenth century." The opening of the Santa Giulia Museum in 1998 prompted the publication of illustrated texts on the exhibition material, including the Martinengo Mausoleum, for which several important historical images were published.

=== Studies and debates of the 21st century ===
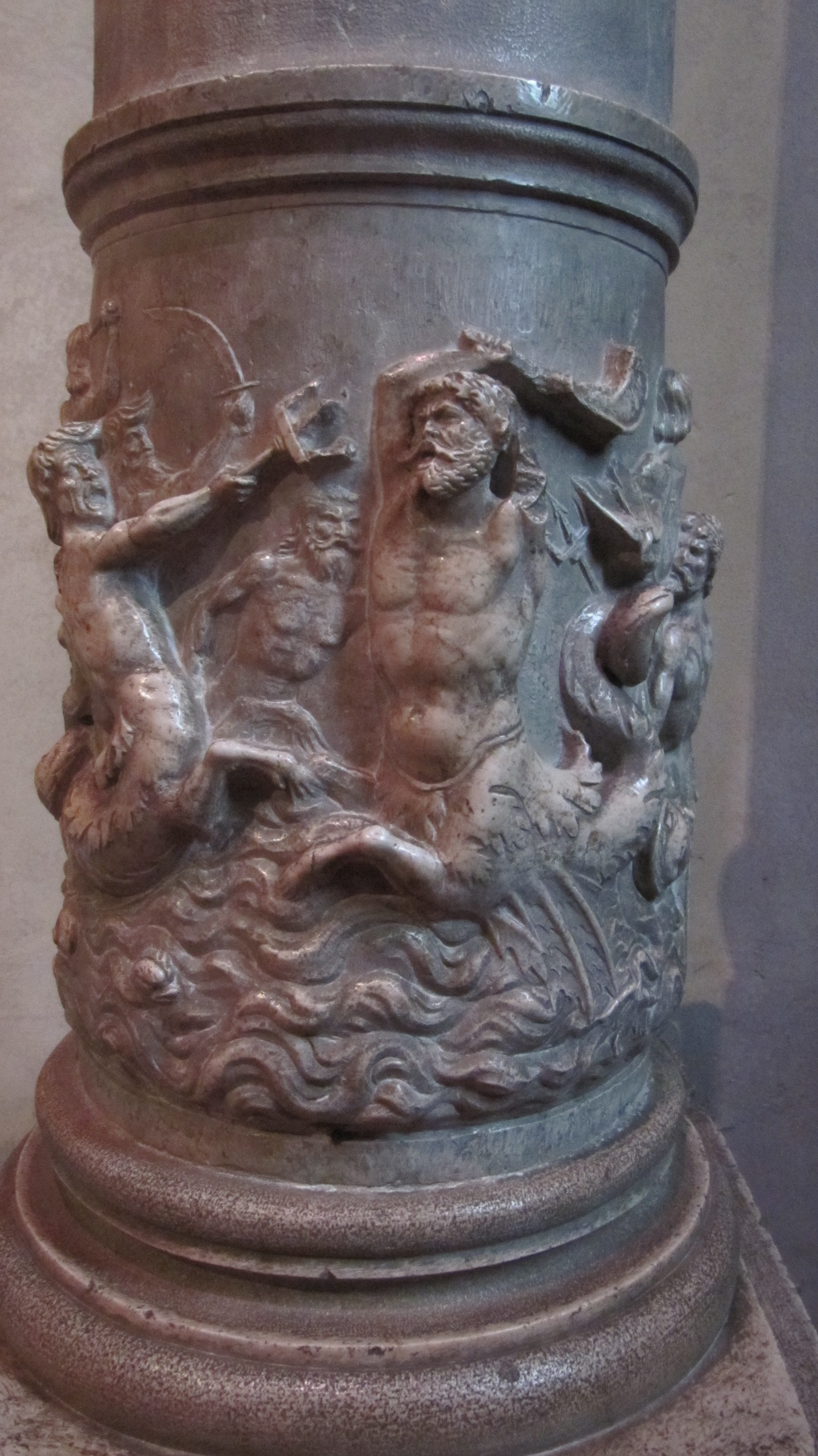
Gasparo Cairano, Altar of Saint Jerome, Battle of the Sea Gods (c. 1506-1510).

In two works published in 2001 and 2003, scholar Vito Zani reinterpreted the sculptural landscape of Renaissance Brescia. He placed Maffeo Olivieri in his proper artistic context, mediated by documents related to him, and proposed Gasparo Cairano as the definitive protagonist of the Brescian artistic period, considering him equal to a "Brescian Amadeo". Cairano emerged as an enterprising contractor, active in public and private commissions, with a rapidly rising artistic career. In these texts, Zani attributed to Gasparo Cairano the works generally accepted by critics, adding the Caprioli Adoration (as Meyer had suggested a century earlier), the stone parts of the Martinengo Mausoleum, and a group of sculptures scattered in museums and collections in Italy and abroad. Zani's proposal was quickly adopted by 21st-century art critics, first by Valerio Terraroli, who published it in Lombardia rinascimentale. Arte e Architettura (Renaissance Lombardy: Art and Architecture) in 2003. This volume, widely distributed even outside Italy, served as a launching text for the "emblematic figure of Gaspare Coirano da Milano".

In 2010, the first monograph dedicated entirely to Gasparo Cairano was finally published by Vito Zani. The text attempts, for the first time, to fully reconstruct the critical vicissitudes of Brescian Renaissance sculpture through the centuries, devoting an entire chapter to this topic, preceded by a reconstruction of the Brescian artistic scene from the mid-15th century onwards and followed by a third chapter tracing the Brescian biographies of sculptors identified in numerous sources, from Gasparo Cairano to Antonio della Porta, Antonio Mangiacavalli, and the Sanmicheli. (Note: Regarding the Sanmicheli, Vito Zani had already attempted in 2007 to trace the historiography of their Brescian trajectory. Cf. Zani (2007)) Zani's contribution proved fundamental, especially for publishing numerous unpublished documents, notably the 1517 survey, which confirmed the sculptor's death before that date, and the 1534 survey of his son Simone, which allowed reconstruction of much of the post-Gasparo genealogy. The greatest contribution, however, remains the reconstruction of the artist's catalog, encompassing all major stone works from early 16th-century Brescia (except the Ark of St. Titian) and adding erratic works scattered globally, revealing clear connections to Gasparo Cairano's chisel. The monograph dedicated to Lombard sculpture between the 15th and 20th centuries, edited by Valerio Terraroli in 2011, includes a summary of Zani's proposed historiographical line in the chapter on Brescian Renaissance sculpture, authored by Zani himself. Shortly thereafter, also in 2010, Giuseppe Sava published an article in “Arte Veneta” reconstructing the figure of Antonio Medaglia, the architect of the Church of San Pietro in Oliveto. He proposed a catalog of Medaglia's works, including figures from the Altar of San Girolamo, suggesting collaboration between Medaglia and Cairano. In passages, Sava commented on Zani's findings, hinting at disagreement with the proposed reconstruction. In 2012, Vito Zani responded to Sava's considerations in an article in the online journal Antiqua, partially accepting the reconstruction regarding Antonio Medaglia while generally defending his theses on Gasparo Cairano. At a Florentine auction in 2011, a sculptural group of three crown-holding angels was presented, with commentary in the auction catalog by Marco Tanzi. (Note: Tanzi (2011, pp. 252–253). The catalog is freely available at [https://issuu.com/pandolfini/docs/20111012?viewMode=magazine&mode=embed this link] or viewable in pdf format at.) Based on the work's dating and stylistic context, Tanzi raised significant criticisms of Vito Zani's 2010 reconstruction of Gasparo Cairano's catalog and the Brescian Renaissance sculptural landscape, though without further publications on the issue. The following year, Zani responded to Tanzi in a three-part article in the online art magazine Antiqua. In the first part, he revised and overturned Tanzi's attribution of the Three Angels; in the second, he rebutted the objections raised in the auction catalog. In the third part, Zani revisited the Brescian sculptor's catalog, reiterating his 2010 points and, crucially, using extensive photographic comparisons to support the grouping of works under Gasparo Cairano's sole authorship.

== See also ==
- Gasparo Cairano
- Renaissance art in Bergamo and Brescia

== Bibliography ==
=== Ancient sources (up to the 19th century) ===
On Brescian topics

- Averoldi, Giulio Antonio (1700). Le scelte pitture di Brescia additate al forestiere [The select paintings of Brescia exposed to the outsider] (in Italian). Brescia.
- Buzzoni, Giovanni Stefano (1498). Epigrammata [Epigrams] (in Latin). Brescia.
- Calzavacca, Illuminato (1654). Universitas heroum urbis Brixiae literis, et armis nulli secunda orbi universo exposita [The university of the heroes of the city of Brixia, in letters and arms, is second to none in the whole world] (in Latin). Brescia.
- Capriolo, Elia (1744). Dell'Istorie della Città di Brescia [About the Stories of the City of Brescia] (in Italian). Venezia.
- Cozzando, Leonardo (1694). Vago, e curioso ristretto profano, e sagro dell'Historia Bresciana [Brescian history: the vague, the curious, the profane and the wise] (in Italian). Brescia.
- Carboni, Giovanni Battista (1754). Notizie istoriche delli pittori, scultori e architetti bresciani [Historical news of Brescian painters, sculptors, and architects] (in Italian).
- Carboni, Giovanni Battista (1760). Le Pitture e Scolture di Brescia che sono esposte al pubblico con un'appendice di alcune private Gallerie [The Paintings and Sculptures of Brescia that are on public display with an appendix from some private Galleries] (in Italian).
- Faino, Bernardino (1630). Catalogo delle chiese di Brescia [Catalog of the churches of Brescia] (in Italian). Brescia.
- Grattarolo, Bongianni (1599). Historia della Riviera di Salò [History of the Riviera of Salò] (in Italian).
- Maccarinelli, Francesco (1747). Le Glorie di Brescia raccolte dalle Pitture, Che nelle sue Chiese, Oratorii, Palazzi et altri luoghi publici sono esposte [The glories of Brescia, collected from the paintings exhibited in its churches, oratories, palaces and other public places.] (in Italian). Brescia.
- Rossi, Ottavio (1620). Elogi historici di Bresciani illustri [Historical eulogies of distinguished Brescians] (in Italian). Brescia.
- Paglia, Francesco (1675). Il Giardino della Pittura [The Garden of Painting] (in Italian). Brescia.
- Spini, Patrizio (1744). "Il Supplimento dell'Istorie della Città di Brescia" [The Supplement to the Stories of the City of Brescia]. Dell'Istorie della Città di Brescia di m. Elia Capriolo [Concerning the Stories of the City of Brescia by Elia Capriolo] (in Italian). Venezia.
- Zaist, Giovanni Battista (1774). Notizie istoriche de' pittori, scultori ed architetti cremonesi [Historical news of the painters, sculptors and architects of Cremona] (in Italian). Cremona.
- Zamboni, Baldassarre (1778). Memorie intorno alle pubbliche fabbriche più insigni della città di Brescia raccolte da Baldassarre Zamboni arciprete di Calvisano [Memoirs concerning the most distinguished public buildings of the city of Brescia collected by Baldassarre Zamboni, archpriest of Calvisano] (in Italian). Brescia.

On other topics

- Gauricus, Pomponius (1504). De sculptura [About sculpture] (in Latin). Firenze.
- Michiel, Marcantonio (1521). Notizia d'opere di disegno [News of paintings] (in Italian).
- Sanudo, Marin (1483). Itinerario per la terraferma veneziana nell'anno MCCCCLXXXIII [Itinerary of the Venetian mainland in the year MCCCCLXXXIII] (in Italian). Venezia.
- Vasari, Giorgio (1550). Le vite de' più eccellenti pittori, scultori e architettori [The Lives of the Most Excellent Painters, Sculptors, and Architects] (in Italian). Firenze.

=== Modern sources (since the 19th century) ===
On Gasparo Cairano

- Agosti, Giovanni (1995). "Intorno ai Cesari della Loggia di Brescia" [About the Caesars of the Brescian Loggia]. La Loggia di Brescia e la sua piazza. Evoluzione di un fulcro urbano nella storia di mezzo millennio [The Brescian Loggia and its square. Evolution of an urban fulcrum in the history of half a millennium] (in Italian). Brescia: Grafo.
- Guerrini, Paolo (1930). "Il Santuario civico dei Miracoli" [The Civic Sanctuary of the Miracles]. Memorie storiche della diocesi di Brescia [Historical Memoirs of the Diocese of Brescia] (in Italian). Vol. I. Brescia: Moretto.
- Ibsen, Monica (1999). Il duomo di Salò [The cathedral of Salò] (in Italian). Gussago.
- Terraroli, Valerio (2003). "Committenza pubblica, invenzioni architettonico-decorative nella Brescia del Rinascimento e l'emblematica figura di Gasparo da Coirano da Milano" [Public commissioning, architectural-decorative inventions in Renaissance Brescia and the emblematic figure of Gasparo da Coirano da Milano]. Lombardia rinascimentale. Arte e architettura [Renaissance Lombardy. Art and Architecture.] (in Italian). Milano: Skira.
- Zani, Vito (December 2001). "Gasparo Coirano. Madonna col Bambino" [Gasparo Coirano. Madonna and Child]. Spunti per Conversare (in Italian) (5). Milano: Galleria Nella Longari.
- Zani, Vito (2003). "Sulle nostalgie di Ambrogio Mazzola, scultore bresciano del Cinquecento" [On the nostalgia of Ambrogio Mazzola, a 16th-century Brescian sculptor]. Civiltà Bresciana (in Italian) (XII, 1). Brescia.
- Zani, Vito (2010). Gasparo Cairano (in Italian). Roccafranca: La Compagnia della Stampa.
- Zani, Vito (2011). "Maestri e cantieri nel Quattrocento e nella prima metà del Cinquecento" [Masters and construction sites in the fifteenth century and the first half of the sixteenth century]. Scultura in Lombardia. Arti plastiche a Brescia e nel Bresciano dal XV al XX secolo [Sculpture in Lombardy. Plastic arts in Brescia and the Brescia area from the 15th to the 20th century.] (in Italian). Milano: Skira.

On Brescian Renaissance sculpture and culture

- Arcioni, Luigi (1896). "La chiesa dei Miracoli in Brescia" [The Church of the Miracles in Brescia]. Arte Italiana Decorativa e Industriale (in Italian) (V, 10).
- Arcioni, Luigi (1897). "La chiesa dei Miracoli a Brescia" [The Church of the Miracles in Brescia]. Arte Italiana Decorativa e Industriale (in Italian) (VI, 1).
- Boselli, Camillo (1977). Regesto artistico dei notai roganti in Brescia dall'anno 1500 all'anno 1560 [Artistic register of notaries in Brescia from the year 1500 to the year 1560] (in Italian). Brescia.
- Fappani, Antonio; Anelli, Luciano (1989). Santa Maria dei Miracoli (in Italian). Brescia.
- Frati, Vasco; Gianfranceschi, Ida; Robecchi, Franco (1995). La Loggia di Brescia e la sua piazza. Evoluzione di un fulcro urbano nella storia di mezzo millennio [The Brescian Loggia and its square. Evolution of an urban fulcrum in the history of half a millennium] (in Italian). Brescia: Grafo.
- Galli, Aldo (1998). "Il Maestro degli angeli cantori e le più antiche sculture lombarde in terracotta" [The Master of the Singing Angels and Lombardy's oldest terracotta sculptures]. Nuovi Studi. Rivista di arte antica e moderna (in Italian) (6).
- Ragni, Elena Lucchesi; Gianfranceschi, Ida; Mondini, Maurizio, eds. (1998). L'età veneta, l'immagine della città, la scultura monumentale. Santa Giulia, museo della città a Brescia [Venetian age, the image of the city, monumental sculpture. Santa Giulia, museum of the city in Brescia] (in Italian). Milano: Electa.
- Ragni, Elena Lucchesi; Gianfranceschi, Ida; Mondini, Maurizio, eds. (2003). Il coro delle monache - Cori e corali, catalogo della mostra [The nuns' choir - Choirs and chorales, exhibition catalog] (in Italian). Milano: Skira.
- Melani, Alfredo (1899a). "Il monumento di Marc'Antonio Martinengo della Pallata a Brescia" [The monument of Marc'Antonio Martinengo della Pallata in Brescia]. Arte e Storia (in Italian) (XVIII, 9–10).
- Morassi, Antonio (1936). "Per la ricostruzione di Maffeo Olivieri" [For Maffeo Olivieri's reconstruction]. Bollettino d'Arte (in Italian).
- Peroni, Adriano (1963). "L'architettura e la scultura nei secoli XV e XVI" [Architecture and sculpture in the 15th and 16th centuries]. Storia di Brescia [History of Brescia] (in Italian). Brescia: Treccani.
- Sava, Giuseppe (2010). "Antonio Medaglia "lapicida et architecto" tra Vicenza e la Lombardia: il cantiere di San Pietro in Oliveto a Brescia" [Antonio Medaglia “lapicida et architecto” between Vicenza and Lombardy: the site of San Pietro in Oliveto in Brescia]. Arte Veneta (in Italian) (67).
- Terraroli, Valerio (1987). "Itinerario della scultura rinascimentale nelle Cattedrali" [Itinerary of Renaissance Sculpture in Cathedrals]. Le cattedrali di Brescia [The cathedrals of Brescia] (in Italian). brescia: Grafo.
- Zani, Vito (2007). "Sulle tracce dei Sanmicheli a Brescia e Mantova, tra Quattro e Cinquecento" [On the trail of the Sanmicheli in Brescia and Mantua, between the fifteenth and sixteenth centuries]. Tullio Lombardo. Scultore e architetto nella cultura artistica veneziana del Rinascimento, atti del convegno [Tullio Lombardo. Sculptor and architect in the Venetian artistic culture of the Renaissance, conference proceedings] (in Italian). Venezia.

On other topics in Renaissance sculpture and culture

- Adorno, Pietro (1991). Il Verrocchio. Nuove proposte nella civiltà artistica del tempo di Lorenzo il Magnifico [Verrocchio. New proposals in the artistic culture of the time of Lorenzo the Magnificent.] (in Italian). Firenze: Edam.
- Bode, Wilhelm (1906). Die italienische Bronzestatuetten der Renaissance [Italian bronze statuettes of the Renaissance] (in German). Berlino.
- Brentano, Carrol (1989). "Della Porta, Antonio, detto Tamagnino" [Della Porta, Antonio, known as Tamagnino]. Dizionario biografico degli italiani [Biographical Dictionary of Italians] (in Italian). Vol. 37 (voce). Roma: Treccani.
- Burnett, Andrew M.; Schofield, Richard V. (1997). "The Medallions of the Basamento of the Certosa di Pavia. Sources and Influence". Arte Lombarda (120).
- Caglioti, Francesco (2008). "Fifteenth-century reliefs of ancient emperors and empresses in Florence: production and collecting". Collecting sculpture in early modern Europe. New Haven: Yale University Press.
- Cicognara, Leopoldo (1823). Storia della scultura [History of sculpture].
- Ferrari, M.; Zanata, I. (1991). "La cappella del "Sangue de Christo" nella cattedrale di Mantova" [The chapel of the "Blood of Christ" in the cathedral of Mantua]. Storia e arte religiosa a Mantova. Visite di Pontefici e la reliquia del Preziosissimo Sangue [History and religious art in Mantua. Visits of Pontiffs and the Relic of the Precious Blood.] (in Italian). Mantova: Casa del Mantegna.
- Fittschen, Klaus (1985). "Sul ruolo del ritratto antico nell'arte italiana" [On the role of the ancient portrait in Italian art]. Memoria dell'antico nell'arte italiana [Memory of the ancient in Italian art] (in Italian). Torino: Einaudi.
- Hill, George Francis (1923). A corpus of italian medals of the Renaissance before Cellini. Oxford.
- Malaguzzi Valeri, Francesco (1904). Gio. Antonio Amadeo. Scultore e architetto lombardo /1447-1522) [Gio. Antonio Amadeo. Lombard sculptor and architect /1447-1522)] (in Italian). Bergamo.
- Melani, Alfredo (1899b). Dell'ornamento nell'architettura [About ornament in architecture] (in Italian). Milano.
- Meyer, Alfred Gotthold (1900). Oberitalienische Frührenaissance. Bauten und Bildwerke der Lombardei [Early Renaissance in Northern Italy. Buildings and sculptures in Lombardy] (in German). Berlino.
- Merzario, Giuseppe (1893). I maestri comacini [The masters from Como] (in Italian). Milano.
- Nicodemi, Giorgio (1925). Il Bambaia [Bambaia] (in Italian). Gallarate.
- Planiscig, Leo (1921). Venezianische Bildhauer der Renaissance [Venetian sculptors of the Renaissance] (in German). Wien.
- Schofield, Richard V.; Shell, James; Sironi, Grazioso, eds. (1989). Giovanni Antonio Amadeo. Documents. Como: New press Edizioni.
- Schofield, Richard V. (2002). "The Colleoni chapel and the creation of a local all'antica architectural style". Bramante milanese e l'architettura del Rinascimento lombardo [Milanese Bramante and the architecture of the Lombard Renaissance]. Venezia: Marsilio.
- Tanzi, Marco (2011). "Scultore lombardo (Bresciano?) tra Tamagnino e Coirano, 1500 circa. Tre angeli reggicorona. Scultura in marmo, cm 83x62x29." [Lombard sculptor (Brescian?) between Tamagnino and Coirano, c. 1500. Three crown-holding angels. Marble sculpture, 83x62x29 cm.]. Arredi, Mobili e Dipinti Antichi provenienti dalla famiglia Antinori-Buturlin e altre proprietà private [Antique furnishings, furniture and paintings from the Antinori-Buturlin family and other private properties] (in Italian). Firenze: catalogo della casa d'aste Pandolfini.
- Venturi, Adolto (1924). Storia dell'arte italiana [Italian art history].
- Vigezzi, Silvio (1929). La scultura lombarda del Cinquecento [Lombard sculpture of the sixteenth century] (in Italian). Milano.

On other Brescian topics

- Brognoli, Paolo (1826). Nuova guida per la città di Brescia [New guidebook for the city of Brescia] (in Italian). Brescia.
- Cassa, Andrea (1882). S. Francesco. S. Maria dei Miracoli. La Loggia. Il Cimitero. Appunti [S. Francis. S. Maria dei Miracoli. The Loggia. The Cemetery. Notes] (in Italian). Brescia.
- Cocchetti, Carlo (1859). "Brescia e la sua Provincia" [Brescia and its Province]. Grande illustrazione del Lombardo-Veneto diretta da Cesare Cantù. Volume III. Storia e descrizione di Brescia, Cremona, Como e loro contorni [Great illustration of Lombardy-Veneto directed by Cesare Cantù. Volume III. History and description of Brescia, Cremona, Como and their surroundings.] (in Italian). Milano.
- Corna Pellegrini, Alessandra (2011). Floriano Ferramola in Santa Maria del Carmine [Floriano Ferramola in Santa Maria del Carmine] (in Italian). Brescia: Tipografia Camuna.
- Fenaroli, Stefano (1877). Dizionario degli artisti bresciani [Dictionary of Brescian Artists] (in Italian). Brescia.
- Fisogni, Fiorenzo (2011). "Scultori e lapicidi a Brescia dal tardo classicismo cinquecentesco al rococò" [Sculptors and stone carvers in Brescia from late sixteenth-century classicism to rococo]. Scultura in Lombardia. Arti plastiche a Brescia e nel Bresciano dal XV al XX secolo [Sculpture in Lombardy. Plastic arts in Brescia and the Brescia area from the 15th to the 20th century.] (in Italian). Milano: Skira.
- Franchi, Monica, ed. (2002). Le pergamene dell'Archivio Capitolare. Catalogazione e regesti [The Parchments of the Chapter Archives. Cataloguing and Registries] (in Italian). Travagliato.
- Gianfranceschi, Ida, ed. (1986). Piazza della Loggia. Una secolare vicenda al centro della storia urbana e civile di Brescia, atti del seminario didattico (Brescia, 1981-1982) [Piazza della Loggia. A centuries-old affair at the center of Brescia's urban and civil history, proceedings of the teaching seminar (Brescia, 1981-1982)] (in Italian). Brescia.
- Guerrini, Paolo (1926). "Iscrizioni delle chiese di Brescia. Chiesa e chiostri di San Francesco" [Inscriptions of the churches of Brescia. Church and cloisters of San Francesco]. Commentari dell'Ateneo di Brescia per l'Anno 1925 (in Italian).
- Mucchi, Anton Maria (1932). Il duomo di Salò [The cathedral of Salò] (in Italian). Bologna.
- Nicodemi, Giorgio (1920). Brescia (in Italian). Bergamo.
- Odorici, Federico (1853). Storie bresciane dai primi tempi fino all'età nostra narrate da Federico Odorici [Brescian stories from the earliest times to our age narrated by Federico Odorici] (in Italian). Brescia.
- Panazza, Gaetano (1958). I Civici Musei e la Pinacoteca di Brescia [The Civic Museums and Art Gallery of Brescia] (in Italian). Bergamo.
- Rivetti, Luigi (1920). La chiesa parrocchiale di Chiari. Note di storia ed arte [The parish church of Chiari. Notes on history and art] (in Italian). Chiari.
- Sala, Alessandro (1834). Pitture ed altri oggetti di belle arti in Brescia [Paintings and other objects of fine arts in Brescia] (in Italian). Brescia.
- Stipi, Lorenzo Dionisio (1985). Invito a San Pietro in Oliveto. Storia, tradizione, arte, leggenda, folclore [Invitation to San Pietro in Oliveto. History, tradition, art, legend, folklore.] (in Italian). Brescia: Moretto.
- Terraroli, Valerio (1999). Luigi Arcioni. Progetti e restauri a Brescia tra Ottocento e Novecento [Luigi Arcioni. Projects and restorations in Brescia between the nineteenth and twentieth centuries.] (in Italian). Brescia: Musei civici di arte e storia di Brescia.
- Treccani, Gian Paolo (1988). Questioni di "patrii monumenti". Tutela e restauro a Brescia [Issues of "heritage monuments". Protection and restoration in Brescia] (in Italian). Brescia.
- Ugoletti, Antonio (1909). Brescia (in Italian). Bergamo.

On other topics

- Morassi, Antonio (1939). Catalogo delle cose d'arte e d'antichità d'Italia. Brescia [Catalog of the things of art and antiquities of Italy. Brescia] (in Italian). Roma.
- Papaleoni, Giuseppe (1890). Le chiese di Condino prima del 1550 [The churches of Condino before 1550] (in Italian). Trento.
- Passamani, Bruno, ed. (1978). Restauri ed acquisizioni 1973-1978 [Restorations and acquisitions 1973-1978] (in Italian). catalogo della mostra, Trento.
- Picenardi, Giuseppe (1820). Nuova guida di Cremona per gli amatori dell'arti del disegno [New Cremona guide for lovers of the drawing arts] (in Italian). Cremona.
- Selvatico, Pietro (1847). Sulla scultura e sulla architettura in Venezia dal Medio Evo sino ai giorni nostri [On sculpture and architecture in Venice from the Middle Ages to the present day] (in Italian). Venezia.
- Schlosser, Julius von (1924). La letteratura artistica. Manuale delle fonti della storia dell'arte moderna [Art literature. Handbook of the sources of modern art history] (in Italian).
