= Caprioli Adoration =

c. 1495 marble relief by Gasparo Cairano

The Caprioli Adoration
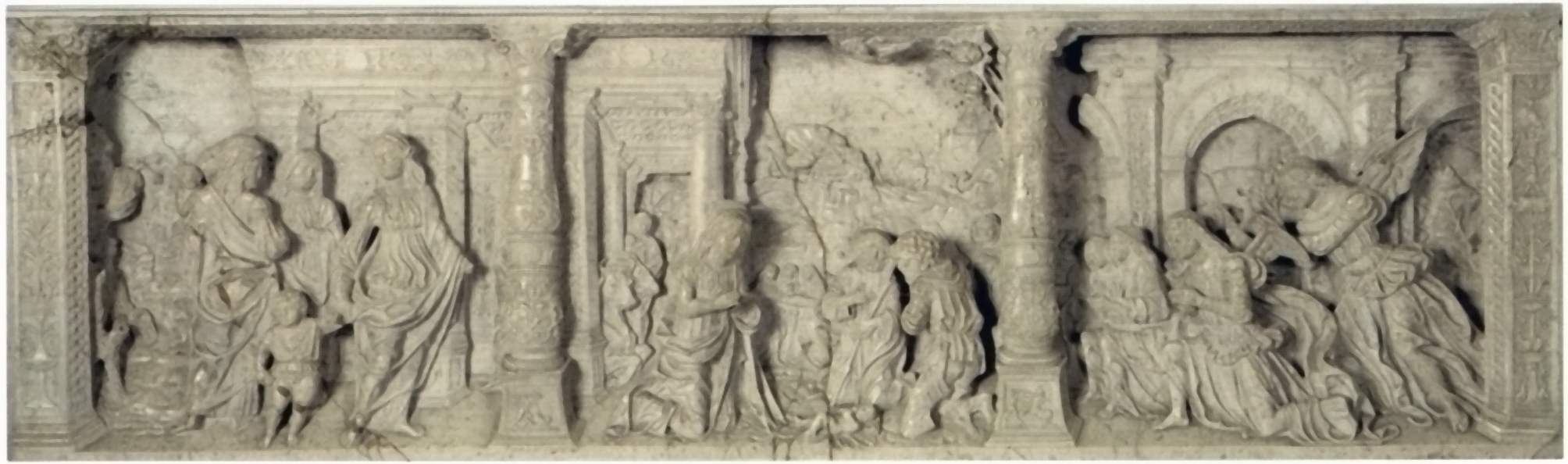
- Artist: Gasparo Cairano
- Year: 1495-1500
- Medium: Marble
- Movement: Renaissance
- Dimensions: 60 cm × 200 cm (24 in × 79 in)
- Location: Church of St Francis of Assisi, Brescia

The Caprioli Adoration is an Italian Renaissance sculpture, a relief in marble by Gasparo Cairano, dated between 1495 and 1500, placed in the Church of St Francis of Assisi in Brescia as a frontal for the high altar.

== History ==
Originally, this relief was part of the funeral monument of Luigi Caprioli kept in the family chapel in the Church of San Giorgio in Brescia. From Bernardino Faino, Francesco Paglia, and other seventeenth and eighteenth century scholars, it is known that the relief was inserted into some sort of architectural apparatus, to which a figurative altarpiece was attached. Possibly the altarpiece was by Cairano, but it has since been lost.

Faino writes that the altarpiece depicted a Madonna with Child between the saints Joseph and Catherine. From the original architectural structure, there remains only a frame which serves as a jamb outside the chapel. A copy of a guide to Brescia by Alessandro Sala (from 1834) gives notice of some changes in ownership of the work:

There already existed in the church of San Giorgio a monument to Count Luigi Capriolo, above which was the following inscription: Aloysio Capreolo Patritio / Religione. Fide. Innocentia / Meritis. In. Rem. P. Spectatiss / Summis. Honoribus. Functo. Qui / Ætatis LXXVII Theogoniae / Anno MCCCCLXXXXII / F.M.I Augustinus. F. Patri. Optatissim / D.D. Part of the monument or the jambs can still be seen in the church at the altar of San Francesco and the low relief that stood on the front of the monument is now in the parapet of the high altar of San Francesco in Brescia. A certain rector of San Giorgio sold part of the monument to Count Paolo Tosio and the heirs of Count Tosio sold it to another in Brescia who finally passed it to San Francesco.

— Biblioteca Queriana, P. VII. 35, bound sheet opposite p. 104.

Since the responsibility for the first sale of the relief is attributed to a certain rector, it implies that the dismemberment of the apparatus occurred before the church was taken over by the state, which happened in 1805. The same inscription had already been reported by Sebastiano Aragonese in a codex in the second half of the sixteenth century, later transmitted by other sources, mainly in collections of Brescian epigraphy. Traces of this tombstone have also been lost, though around 1800 there was still talk of a broken tombstone in the small courtyard adjacent to the residence of the vicar of San Giorgio.

Before its final emplacement, the relief also entered the collection of the scholar Paolo Brognoli who critically compared it with the ark of Sant'Appollonio. The work finally arrived at the Church of St Francis in 1841 to be used as a frontal on the high altar, as part of its reconstruction in neoclassical style by Rodolfo Vantini.

== Description ==
The work depicts, in bas-relief on a monolithic block, an Adoration of the Shepherds organized in three sections. In the central section there is pure worship, in the right panel some angels are in attitude of prayer, while in the left frame are placed other figures. The subdivision into sectors takes place through free and variously composed and decorated columns, typical of sculpture in the Brescian Renaissance and very similar to those of the Mausoleum of Martinengo, all framed at the two ends by two quadrangular pillars decorated with geometric patterns and candelabras.

On the background of the figures are arranged classical architectures, depicted in central perspective and often foreshortened – for example the colonnade on the left from whose pillars appear in the background an ox and a donkey, and a human figure placed on a more distant level. The relief, in general, has a simple, immediate and rich narrative detail, where even the individual figures have a refined workmanship.

== Style ==
In 1826 Paolo Brognoli, an art scholar and collector, published the first nineteenth-century guide of Brescia. For the correct attribution and dating of the works discussed, he undertook a series of archival researches, which led him for the first time to elaborate precise stylistic considerations for his observations. For the Ark of Sant'Apollonio, in particular, he conducted careful research in the municipal archives, which allowed him to partially reconstruct the circumstances of its commission. He could not locate the contract with the sculptor who worked on the ark, but noted its interesting similarities to a monument by the same chisel from 1494 that had an inscription in the memory of Luigi Caprioli, which was, of course, the Caprioli Adoration. This was the first time a work was connected to another by Cairano not on the basis of prior literary sources but by purely stylistic consideration. Meanwhile, independently, Meyer formulated the same conclusion.

Subsequent artistic criticism framed the work either to one of Cairano's followers or even Tamagnino, and to various periods between the end of the fifteenth to the beginning of the sixteenth century.

In 2008, Vito Zani proposed assigning the work to Gasparo Cairano, based on previously cited analogies with the ark of Sant'Appollonio. In 2011, the proposal was rehearsed in an extensive monograph on Brescian sculpture edited by Valerio Terraroli. The Caprioli Adoration was recognised as the greatest example of narrative sculpture of the Renaissance Brescia. Cairano is shown to refer directly to the oblong squares of the base of Certosa of Pavia by Amadeo and Benedetto Briosco between 1492 and 1501. Moreover, he demonstrates a technical mastery in the precise perspectives of the squares as well as in the use of a monolithic block, which was not strictly necessary for a work of this kind.

The face of Mary makes the first female appearance in his oeuvre, less mediated than the male figures that Cairano was to apply in his cycle of the Caesars in the Palazzo della Loggia (Brescia). These considerations date the work to the last five years of the fifteenth century. The artefact, indeed, is the first private commission undertaken by Cairano, undertaken while he was in the midst of the construction of the church of Santa Maria dei Miracoli.

== Bibliography ==
- Agosti, Giovanni (1995). "Intorno ai Cesari della Loggia di Brescia". In Frati, Vasco; Gianfranceschi, Ida; Robecchi, Franco (eds.). La Loggia di Brescia e la sua piazza. Evoluzione di un fulcro urbano nella storia di mezzo millennio. Brescia: Grafo.
- Brognoli, Paolo (1826). Nuova guida per la città di Brescia. Brescia.
- Faino, Bernardino (1630–1669). Catalogo delle chiese di Brescia. Brescia.
- Meyer, Alfred Gotthold (1900). Oberitalienische Frührenaissance. Bauten und Bildwerke der Lombardei. Berlin.
- Paglia, Francesco (1675–1713). Il Giardino della Pittura. Brescia.
- Zani, Vito (2008). "Due commiati bresciani e un falso avvistamento a Salò per il Tamagnino". In Bentivoglio Ravasio, Beatrice (ed.). La Certosa di Pavia e il suo museo. Ultimi restauri e nuovi studi. Milan: Ministero per i Beni e le Attività Culturali, Direzione Regionale per i Beni Culturali e Paesaggistici della Lombardia.
- Zani, Vito (2010). Gasparo Cairano. Roccafranca: La Compagnia della Stampa.
- Zani, Vito (2011). "Maestri e cantieri nel Quattrocento e nella prima metà del Cinquecento". In Terraroli, Valerio (ed.). Scultura in Lombardia. Arti plastiche a Brescia e nel Bresciano dal XV al XX secolo. Milan: Skira.
