= Tamagnino =

Italian sculptor

- Born: Antonio della Porta c. 1471; Osteno
- Died: c. 1520; Porlezza
- Known for: Sculpture
- Movement: High Renaissance

Antonio della Porta, better known as Tamagnino (Osteno, c. 1471 – Porlezza, c. 1520) was an Italian sculptor of the Renaissance.

== Biography ==
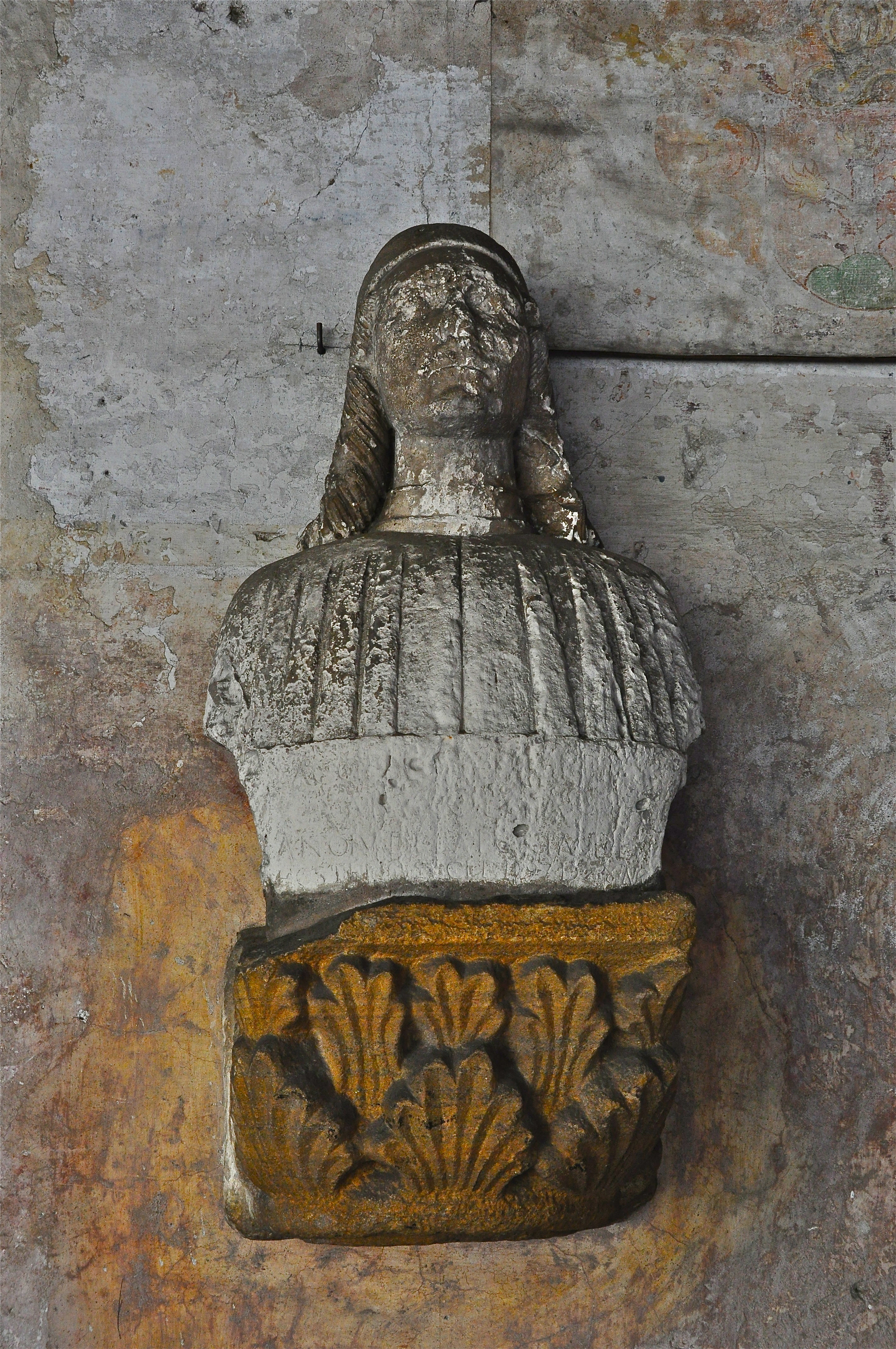
Bust of a man (1497) found at Castello Visconteo in Locarno

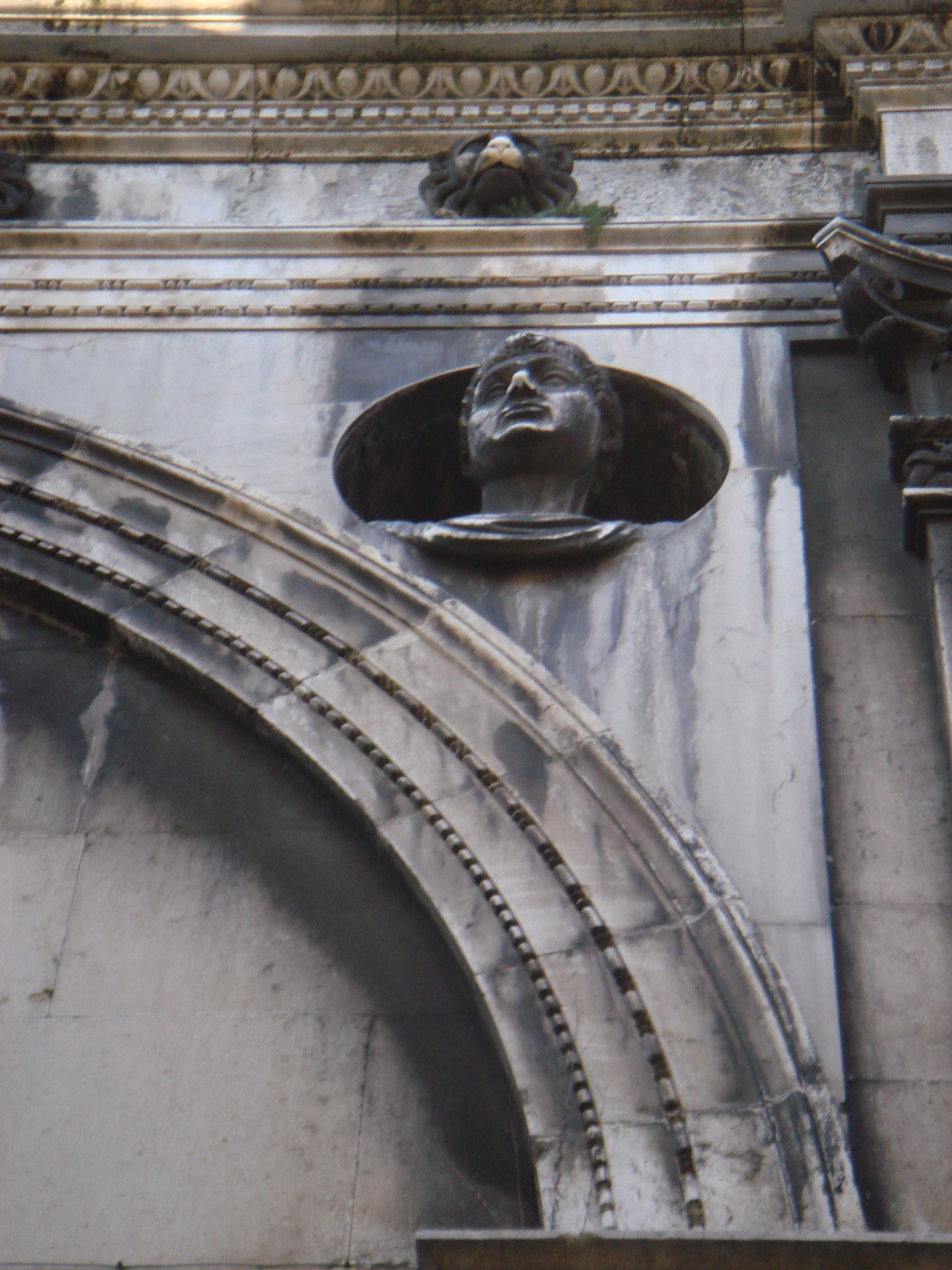
One of the Caesars of Tamagnino for the Loggia palazzo of Brescia.

Tamagnino, a sculptor and decorative artist, belonging to a known family of artists of Porlezza was the son of Giacomo (1430–1481), also a sculptor, and the brother of Guglielmo and Bartolomeo (1460–1514). His mother was the sister of Maddalena Solari, the daughter of Guiniforte Solari, chief engineer of the Duomo of Milan. His first appearance in the historical record is in Brescia, when he is commissioned for a cycle of twelve Angels for the main dome of the church of Santa Maria dei Miracoli, Brescia. He delivered only ten, which were executed approximately at the same time as Gasparo Cairano's cycle of twelve Apostles, and paid for on 24 December 1489.

In general, all the lapidary work during the construction of the Santa Maria dei Miracoli that followed the Apostle cycle and in the interior of the building was due to Cairano and his workshop. It is assumed that the early work on the sculptural cycles was a prelude for the right to continue the work in the church, and resulted in a competition between Tamagnino and Cairano. The cycle of the Angels by Tamagnino is of higher quality than Cairano's, not only for the relative modernity of the former's style which followed the neo-classicism of the Venetian artist Antonio Rizzo, but also for the superior technical quality demonstrated. It is likely, therefore, that Cairano's capture of all subsequent lapidary work at the Santa Maria dei Miracoli stemmed from some local support, which enabled him to sideline Tamagnino. In addition to the Angels, Tamagnino also delivered three of four busts for the pendentives of the main dome, and Doctors of the Church (Note: Historical sources for the attribution of these works are not unanimous. The Martinengo memorial of 1731 (see Guerrini 1930, pp. 189–218) ascribe the three medallions of St. Ambrose, St. Augustine and St. Jerome to Tamagnino, while Sala (see Sala, p. 90.) attributes the fourth, San Gregorio, although critical stylistic analysis excludes it. See also Zani 2010, p. 98, note 59, and p. 121.) as well as two smaller roundels for the frieze in the nave: for these five artefacts, three of which were very large, and for the twelve Angels, Tamagnino was compensated less than Cairano was for his Apostles. (Note: Gasparo Cairano is paid nine lire for each statue of the Apostles, for a total of 108 lire, while Tamagnino receives 106 lire for the twelve Angels and the five reliefs. See the transcription by Guerrini 1930, pp. 209–210, of the lost document in Archivio Storico di Santa Maria dei Miracoli, cart. A, fasc. 3.)

This discrimination serves as a plausible explanation for Tamagnino's departure from Brescia, even while the work on the Santa Maria dei Miracoli continued. Tamagnino found his work undervalued and underpaid in comparison to Cairano, who at the time was less proficient than him. Tamagnino received the prestigious contract for the facade of the Certosa di Pavia, which was to be performed under the direction of Father Amadeo and Antonio Mantegazza. The compact between the artist and the two sculptors was further tightened in May 1492, and created a unique training for Tamagnino as well as a remarkable leap in his career.

In 1499, the Duchy of Milan was conquered by the French, causing a diaspora of artists from the city throughout northern Italy and beyond. This possibly explains Tamagnino's return to Brescia, as well as the contract for the decorative stonework for the Loggia palazzo, in which he participated between November 1499 and June 1500. The palazzo which had opened in 1492 following Tamagnino's first departure from Brescia was at the time in the firm control of Gasparo Cairano, who had for some years become the sculptor of choice for the Brescian elite, both public and private.

Before Tamagnino's arrival in 1499, Cairano had already delivered at least five different Caesars and other stonework, but in that year there is only a record of a payment for a single protome virile, since the Cairano's attention was completely absorbed by the two giant trophies he had recently started work on. In November 1499, Tamagnino was seen to be very active: he delivered four Caesars and three leonine protome, showcasing his skills and his calibre. But in the following seven months, Cairano records successive advances and balances for trophies in full production mode that does not affect his other works, whereas Tamagnino only realises two Caesars and seventeen leonine busts. The creation of leonine busts was considered repetitive and could be consigned to low calibre stonecutters, and Tamagnino was paid much less than the average payment received by Cairano for artefacts of the same type. (Note: By way of comparison, note that twenty soldi made a Venetian lira; on 27 May 1500, Tamagnino was paid forty-five soldi (just over two lire each) for his eight leonine protome. For the same artefacts, Gaspare da Carsogna, a stonecutter, received three lire each, Iacopo Campione received two lire, and Girolamo di Canonica got three lire, while Gasparo Cairano was paid eight lire for each protome virile delivered. See Zamboni.)

Tamagnino's Caesars, six in total and of fine workmanship, are virtually relegated to the south and west flanks, and to the back of the building, which was much less frequented. Faced by the depreciation of his work, it is likely that Tamagnino's sixth Caesar, of far poorer quality than the rest of the cycle was meant to taunt Cairano and their clients, who for the second time had sabotaged the success, or at least the proper recognition of Tamagnino's talent. After these events, Tamagnino abandoned Brescia, probably forever, leaving Gasparo Cairano as the chief exponent of the Brescian sculptural scene.

Tamagnino's Bust of Acellino Salvago, his masterpiece, is preserved in the Bode Museum in Berlin.

== Bibliography ==
- Agosti, Giovanni (1995). "Intorno ai Cesari della Loggia di Brescia". In Frati, Vasco; Gianfranceschi, Ida; Robecchi, Franco (eds.). La Loggia di Brescia e la sua piazza. Evoluzione di un fulcro urbano nella storia di mezzo millennio. Brescia: Grafo. ISBN 88-7385-269-6.
- Guerrini, Paolo (1930). "Memorie storiche della diocesi di Brescia". Il Santuario civico dei Miracoli. Vol. I. Brescia: Moretto.
- Majocchi, Rodolfo (1949). Codice diplomatico artistico di Pavia dall'anno 1330 all'anno 1550. Vol. II. Pavia.
- Schofield, Richard V.; Shell, James; Sironi, Grazioso, eds. (1989). Giovanni Antonio Amadeo. Documents. Como: New press. ISBN 88-953-8349-4.
- Zani, Vito (2010). Gasparo Cairano. Roccafranca: La Compagnia della Stampa. ISBN 978-88-8486-400-0.
- Zani, Vito (2011). "Maestri e cantieri nel Quattrocento e nella prima metà del Cinquecento". In Valerio Terraroli (ed.). Scultura in Lombardia. Arti plastiche a Brescia e nel Bresciano dal XV al XX secolo. Milan: Skira. ISBN 978-88-572-0523-6.
- Zamboni, Baldassarre. Collectanea de rebus Brixiae. Biblioteca Queriniana. Ms. H. III. M. 2.
- Sala, Alessandro (1834). Pitture ed altri oggetti di belle arti in Brescia. Brescia.
