= Santi Faustino e Giovita, Brescia =

Church in Lombardy, Italy

Church of Saints Faustinus and Jovita
- Chiesa dei Santi Faustino e Giovita
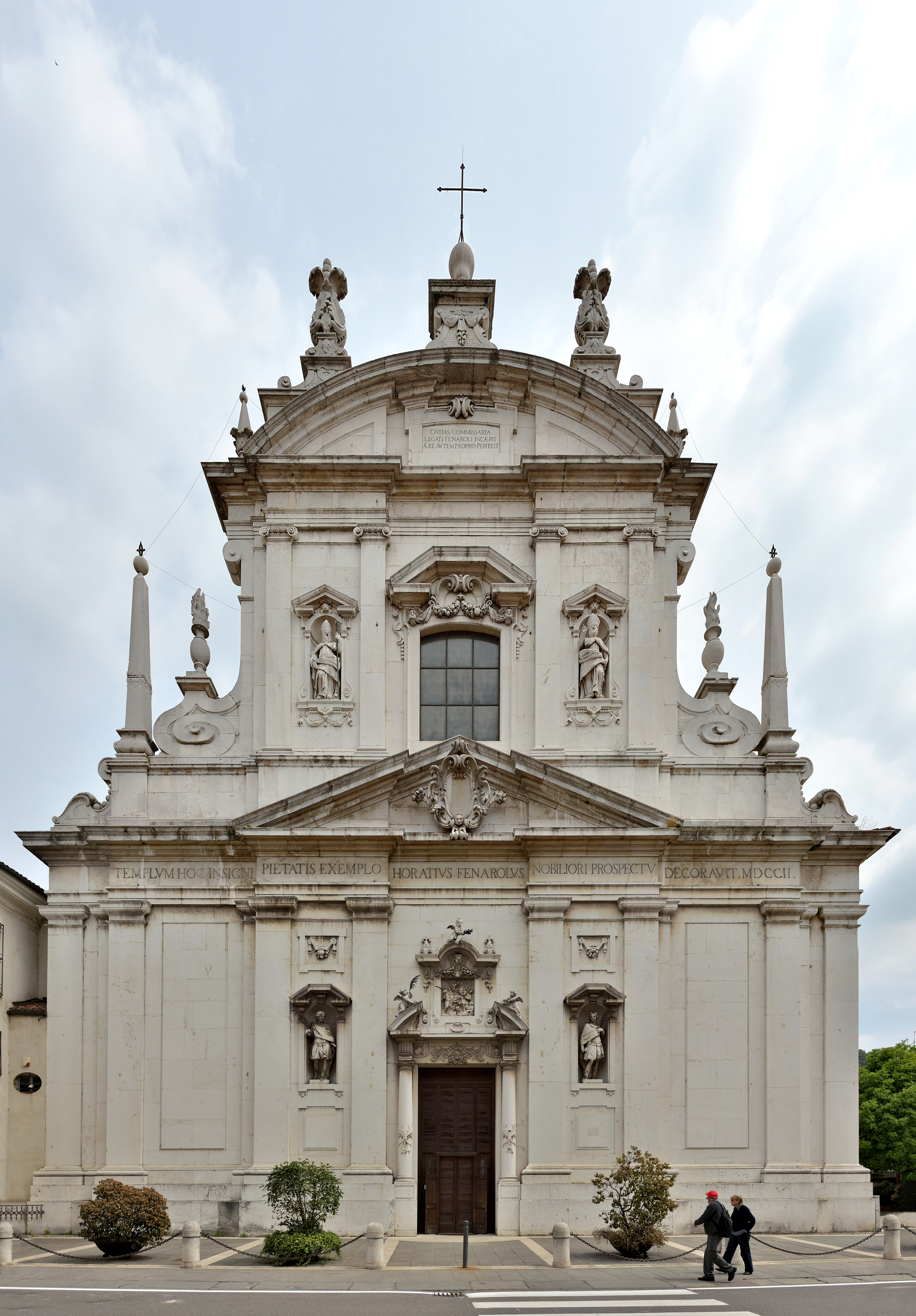
- The facade

- Location within Italy
- 45.54375°N 10.220022°E
- Location: Lombardy, Brescia, Italy
- Address: Via San Faustino, 70
- Denomination: Catholic

History
- Consecrated: 1142

Architecture
- Style: Baroque
- Groundbreaking: Probably in the 8th century. Construction of the present building began in 1621
- Completed: Last interventions in the mid-18th century

Administration
- Diocese: Roman Catholic Diocese of Brescia

The church of Saints Faustinus and Jovita, also known as the church of San Faustino Maggiore, is a church in Brescia, located on the street of the same name, Via San Faustino, along the last stretch to the north. It is the patron church of the city of Brescia and, for this reason, it is the most important religious building in the city after the cathedrals, the Old Cathedral and the New Cathedral.

The church, linked to the adjoining monastery founded in the 9th century by Bishop Ramperto, has its origins in a building possibly dating back to the 8th century, which has seen numerous extensions and reconstructions over the centuries, particularly the 17th-century intervention, which involved a radical renovation of the structure and decorations.

The church preserves extensive Baroque frescoes, particularly the one in the nave by Tommaso Sandrino and the one in the chancel, the Apotheosis of Saints Faustinus, Jovita, Benedict and Scholastica by Giandomenico Tiepolo. Notable works of pictorial art are also the Nativity of Jesus by Lattanzio Gambara, the Deposition of Christ by Sante Cattaneo, and the standard of the Blessed Sacrament painted by Romanino. Other works of art include the sepulchral ark of the two titular saints. Once in the church and now in the Santa Giulia Museum are the triptych of St. Honorius and the famous rooster of Ramperto.

From the religious point of view, the remains of Brescia's two patron saints, Saints Faustinus and Jovita, as well as those of St. Honorius and St. Antigius, are preserved there, making the church a point of reference for the city's devotion.

== History ==
=== Origins ===
==== The church of Santa Maria in Silva ====
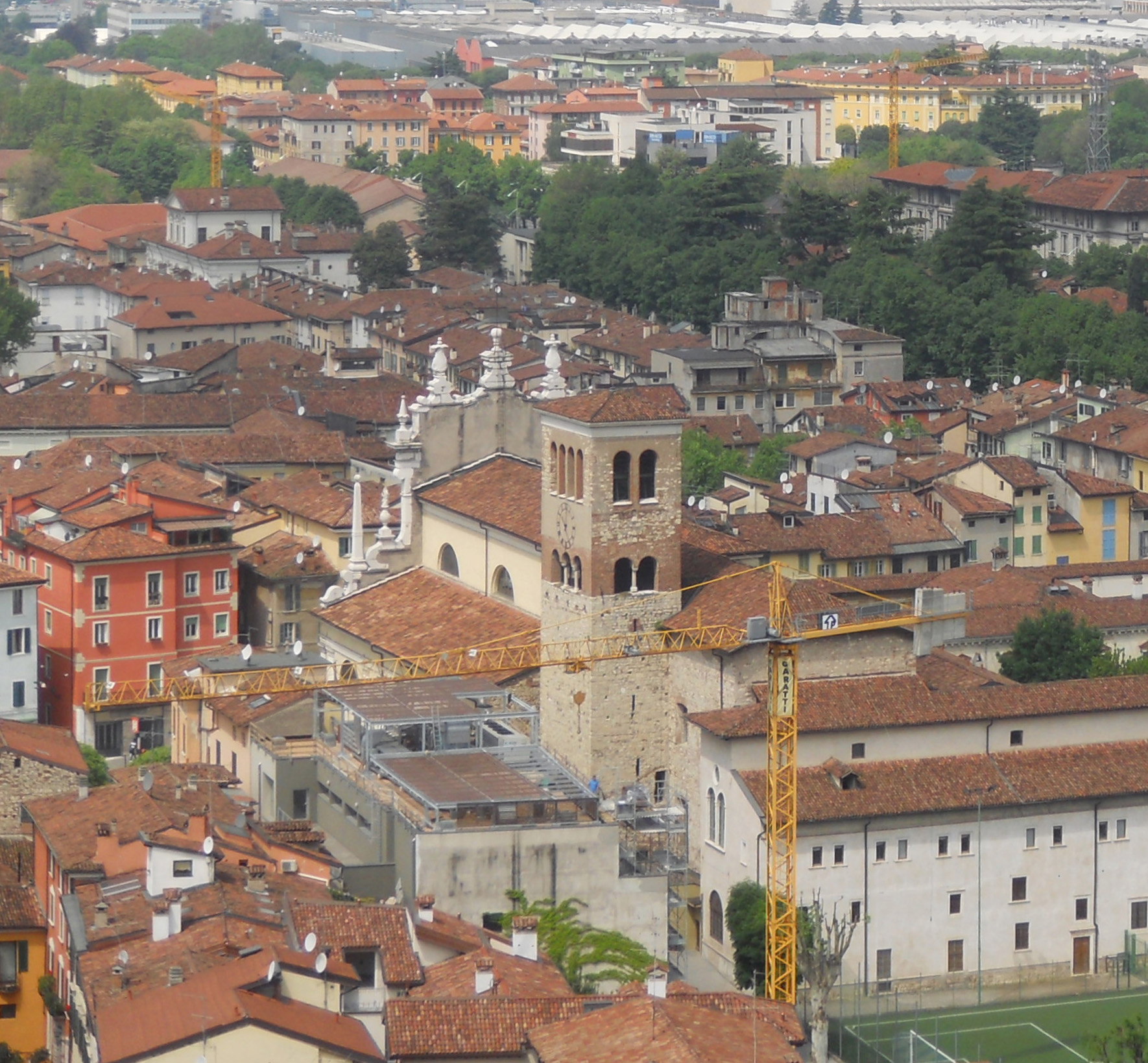
The church as seen from Brescia Castle: note the three-nave layout, the tall facade affixed in the 17th century, and the ancient bell tower with the varied stratigraphy.

The church of Santa Maria in Silva, the primitive core of the sanctuary, was probably built in the 8th century on the same site occupied by the present building, near the Garza stream, in the populous north-central district of the walled city. On May 9, 806, the transfer of the relics of Saints Faustinus and Jovita from the basilica of San Faustinus ad Sanguinem (since 1956 renamed to the church of Sant'Angela Merici) to Santa Maria in Silva took place, thus assuming considerable importance within the city's religious scene. Among other things, at a moment when the procession stopped near Porta Bruciata (the west end of Via Musei, at the corner of Piazza della Loggia) the remains are said to have exuded blood: Duke Naimon of Bavaria, who was present at the moment of the miracle, is said to have converted to Catholicism and thus donated to the city the relic of the True Cross, which has been kept in the Old Cathedral ever since as the main piece of the treasure of the Holy Crosses. The church of San Faustino in Riposo would also be built on the site of the miracle. However, the reasons that led to this transfer, which certainly had a strong impact in the city, are not known.

==== Ramperto and the foundation of the monastery ====
By mid-century, however, the physical condition of the church seemed to be verging on the worst: the place was no longer diligently officiated at and the worship of the remains of the two martyrs neglected. Ramperto, elected bishop in 815 and a great promoter of the cult of the patron saints, underwrote donations in 841 in favor of an establishing "cenobium monachorum" near the little church, probably boosting an already existing religious community. Most likely, Ramperto did not limit himself only to this, but planned a real operational program: to enforce and better administer the bequests of the faithful, to lead to better preservation of relics, and to have from the exemplary behavior, which would be imposed on the newly established monastery, stimulus for the population to do good. Consequently, it is also likely that Ramperto provided for an initial reconstruction of the church and bell tower. In 843 it was again Ramperto who intervened in the church, where he replaced the sepulchral ark of the saints with a marble one, within which a lead tablet bearing the dedicatory inscription was left. Ramperto's work, in essence, proved essential: by founding a monastery hinged around the cult of the relics of the two martyrs, he laid a solid foundation for the subsequent growth of the monastic community.

=== From the foundation to the 15th century ===
==== Decadence ====
The monastery, now established, seemed to spend almost three hundred years undisturbed until the first half of the 12th century. First signs of uncertainty emerge precisely in documents from these years, when in 1123 and 1133 the abbots request first from Pope Callixtus II and then from Pope Innocent II confirmation of property and privileges for their monastery. The requests would turn out to be necessitated by a situation of instability caused by political and social upheavals, derived mainly from the preaching of Arnold of Brescia against the power of the clergy. During this period, the church was rebuilt or reconstructed, probably enlarged: the consecration took place in 1142. At present, the church is a large building of Romanesque lines, with three naves. There is also a large crypt under the chancel enriched by several altars, including one dedicated to the titular saints and that of St. Honorius. The room, which was slightly underground, considerably elevated the presbytery above, so much so that a flight of steps was necessary to reach it.

The monastery and its finances, meanwhile, entered a slow but steady descent. By 1314, its situation was disastrous: the properties, though vast, were poorly managed and, after decades of neglect and mismanagement, were now in the hands of rapacious tenants, providing little or no income. The situation eventually came to a head: in 1341, the management of the monastery was given in commendation to external abbots.

The situation remained unchanged for at least a century. The only factor that should have kept the population's interest in the fortunes of the monastery was, as far as it appears from the documents that have come down to us, the great loyalty to the patron saints, to whom the church was named. In 1422, it was the city municipality that asked the Holy See to place the monastery under the control of the Friars Minor, due to the misconduct of the commendatory abbots, who often turned into mere speculators. However, the proposal was not followed up. There are also several donations and testamentary bequests recorded between the second half of the 14th century and the beginning of the 15th century. The community seemed to spend the first two tumultuous decades of the fifteenth century unscathed, when Brescia passed from the hands of the Visconti to those of Pandolfo III Malatesta, and a few years later to the domains of the Republic of Venice.

==== The miracle of 1438 and the revival ====
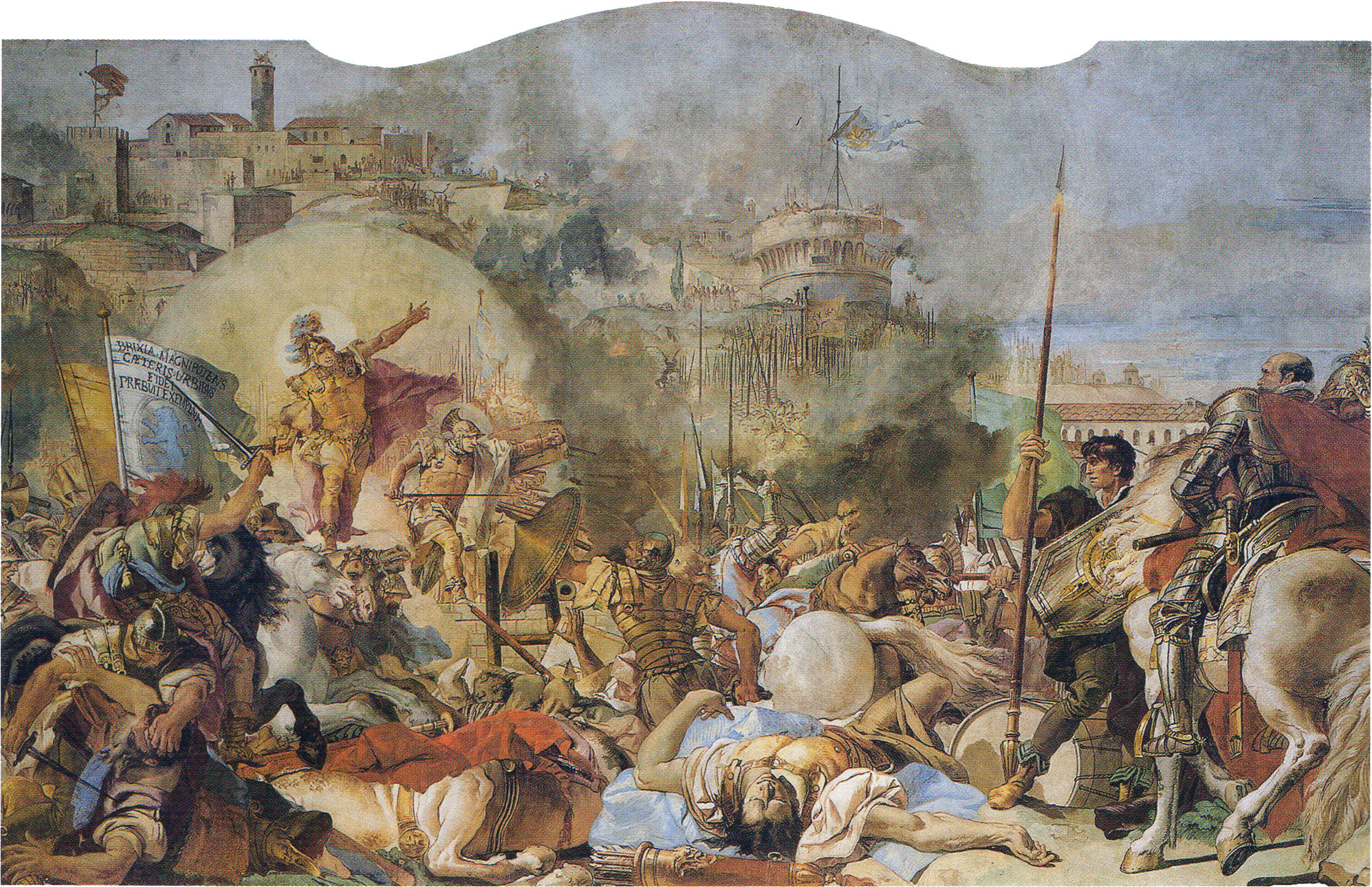
The Intervention of the patron saints in defense of besieged Brescia by Nicolò Piccinino frescoed by Giandomenico Tiepolo in 1754-1755. The fresco is located in the church, on the left wall of the chancel, and depicts the miracle that occurred in 1438.

In 1437, hostilities between Venice and Milan resumed and directly involved the city: the Visconti attempted a first reconquest of Brescia in 1438 and sent their troops, led by Niccolò Piccinino, to the siege. According to the chronicles of the time, the besiegers, who had been stationed outside the city for several months by then, were about to gain the upper hand when, on December 13, during an extended attack on the Roverotto terraces, on the city's eastern curtain wall, the shining figures of the two saints appeared on top of the walls, putting Piccinino's army to flight and saving Brescia from conquest. The miracle, whether real or presumed, ended up radically changing the city's devotion, focusing it on the figure of the two martyr saints. A veritable wave of bequests and donations invested the church and the monastery, which entered a chapter of newfound prosperity.

In 1444 the administration of the monastery passed under the control of Abbot Bernardo Marcello who, inspired by the new, very strong devotion of the citizens, maintained a lively administrative conduct and promoted important restoration works inside the crypt. Fate was favorable to him and, to the already fervent devotion due to the miracle of 1438, another event shook the citizens' attention to the monastery: on December 11, 1455, the sepulchral ark of the two saints made by Ramperto in his time was found behind the crypt's high altar. The tomb was opened during a solemn ceremony and the remains of the two patron saints were found and recognized inside. The inscription left by Ramperto was also found in its place. The young Tonino from Lumezzane took on the task of renovating the seat of the ark, which was placed in place of the crypt's high altar on top of six marble columns.

==== Annexation to the Congregation of St. Justina ====
The monastery, now of solidly established importance, still found itself under commendation, with no fixed community to run it. The situation, by now intolerable and also impractical after the recent events that had diverted the faith of the population to the church, finally found a definitive solution on March 24, 1490 when, by a bull of Pope Innocent VIII, the monastery was united to the Congregation of St. Justina of Padua. This was the end of a long period of decline: a month later, the friars of the Benedictine Order took full possession of the facilities, immediately launching a major campaign of rehabilitation and modernization, with numerous interventions to achieve a better use of the complex. A document of 1501 mentions, referring to the construction of a new cloister, "de fundamentis cenobii San Faustini Maioris Brixiae," suggesting that the "foundations of the monastery" mentioned were not only those of the cloister, but the start of a more extensive project, a true total renovation of the monastery, which in fact would take place in the following decades.

However, the grand project almost immediately suffered a major setback, caused by the tragic events of the reconquest of Brescia by Milan at the hands of the French, which would end with the bloody sacking of 1512. The building revival of the monastery, most likely, was not to take place in the years immediately following, as Venice regained possession of the city once again: from 1520 onward, however, the works experienced intense activity. In 1532 the organ by Gian Giacomo Antegnati was installed, while the structures of the monastery, especially the cloisters and the new dormitory, were substantially completed. However, in the second half of the century, Lattanzio Gambara frescoed the entire presbytery area: his work would be admired a few years later, in 1566, by Giorgio Vasari, who was visiting Brescia. Meanwhile, master builder Geronimo Tobanello, who was already working in other areas of the monastery, took care of the first adaptations of Renaissance architecture inside the church, affixing on the walls of the aisles, around the chapels, a rhythmic succession of marble lesenes, all designed by Giovanni Maria Piantavigna. The first chapel on the right was also renovated, building a new altar reusing parts of the old one and dedicating it to St. Michael the Archangel. The work was taken over during the visit of St. Charles Borromeo in October 1580, who took note of both the embellishment lesenes and the new chapel and ordered that the north wall of the church, which had remained intact up to that time, be broken through to create three new mirrored chapels.

=== The 17th century ===
==== Early interventions ====
The seventeenth century thus began in the midst of this fervid activity of reconstruction. The first reconstructions planned by Piantavigna, the expansion orders of St. Charles Borromeo, and the new structures of the monastery now successfully completed must have instilled in the monks of St. Faustinus the inspiration for a true, radical renovation of the interior of the church as well. The latter must have had, at least for the time, an unpleasant appearance: the wall structures were still those of the 14th century, and the naves were covered with exposed truss roofs. The chancel area had already been renovated a few decades earlier, while the church walls had recently been overlaid with new decorative lesenes. The first chapel on the right had just been modernized, and the north wall was to be completely demolished for the construction of three new chapels. The crypt, on the other hand, probably retained its Romanesque appearance with, superimposed, restorations made at the end of the 15th century. Due to the presence of the latter, moreover, the floor of the presbytery could only be reached by a flight of steps, making connections with the hall difficult, in the period of the Counter-Reformation.

Reconstruction work began from the chancel, which in 1604 was lowered through the destruction of the crypt, relocating the relics kept there. Those of the two patron saints were still in the marble ark of Ramperto, enriched by the small columns added more than a century earlier: the whole was, for the time being, simply reassembled in the new presbytery. Likewise, the relics and altar of St. Honorius were moved and reassembled in the back chapel of the right aisle. The final impetus for the continuation of the renovations came unexpectedly from the Municipality of Brescia, which on November 14, 1609 resolved to build, using public money, a new sepulchral ark of the two saints, in the opinion of the councilors by then unsuitable and worthy of greater attention to keep up popular devotion. The contract with sculptor Giovanni Antonio Carra was signed in 1618, finally paving the way for the radical reconstruction of the church.

==== The reconstruction of the church ====
The Venetian window in Comino's project

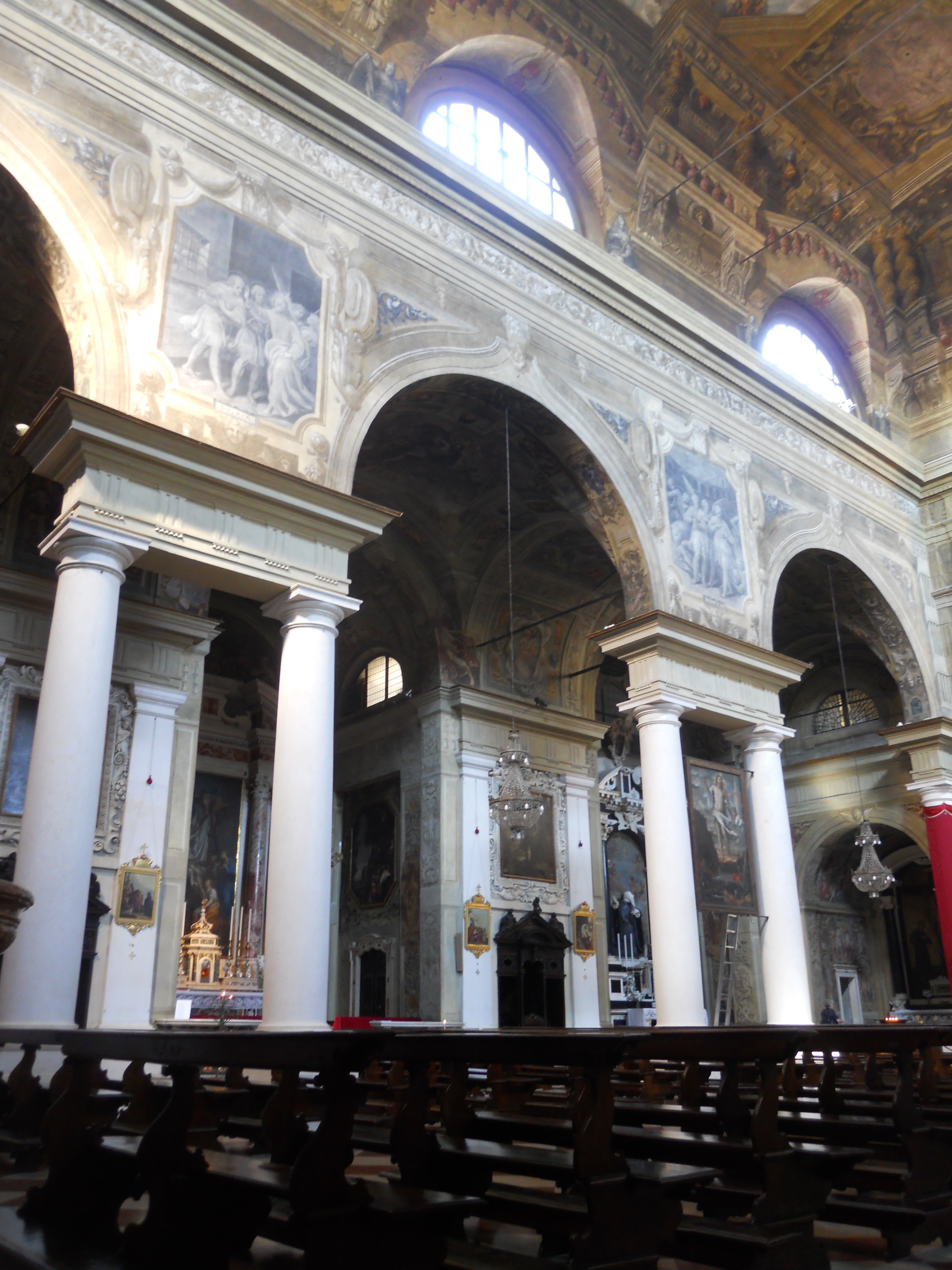

Antonio Comino's design for the reconstruction of the interior of the church included an innovative solution in the Brescia field: the use of the Venetian window as a structural element. This architectural device, already tested and introduced in the Po Valley area by Giulio Romano in the first half of the previous century, had not yet found practical applications in Brescia, except in decorative details and facades. The solution was not a foregone conclusion, since it solved the arduous problem of having wide, unobstructed views inside church buildings while maintaining the three-aisle system, without necessarily having to resort to the single hall. It should be noted, moreover, that Comino was engaged at the same time at the construction site of the new cathedral, which had recently come under the control of Lorenzo Binago, who in turn was familiar with the Venetian window having applied it a few years earlier in the church of Sant'Alessandro in Zebedia in Milan. Binago, therefore, may also have been no stranger to the solution of the use of the Venetian window in San Faustino.

The task of designing and making effective the complete reconstruction of the interior was entrusted to Antonio Comino with a contract signed on September 26, 1620. However, there are some preliminaries, still not fully clarified by historiographical research. Certainly, the economic basis to support the project was provided by the donation of Abbot Faustino Gioia, then head of the monastery, who, on June 16 of the same year, had signed the assignment of all the proceeds of his merchant family to the building site of the new church. Conversely, it is not known from which figure, internal or external to the monastery, pursued the idea of initiating the renovation: a role on the part of Carra himself cannot be ruled out, who, having to build the new sepulchral ark of the saints, probably wondered whether the monument would have found a worthy home in a Romanesque-Gothic church with Renaissance decorations. In fact, there may not even have been a single figure, but rather a common will later concretized by Abbot Gioia, Antonio Comino, and Carra. In any case, clearance operations began in the following weeks: in particular, the relics kept in the altar of Saint Antigio, the decorations of the altar of the Blessed Sacrament, and all the canvases were removed. The altar of St. Honorius, which had been reassembled a few years before, was also dismantled. The foundation stone of the new church was finally laid on March 9, 1621.

However, as early as March 20, work was suspended. A heated debate arose, involving various figures inside and outside the monastery: a great deal of confusion emerges from the documents, with numerous stances and different versions of the affair. Attempting to reconstruct the facts, the construction site was interrupted basically for two reasons: to ascertain the availability of funding from Abbot Gioia and to verify, before advancing too far with the work, the static validity of the project, as there were doubts about the correctness of Comino's design regarding the size of the serlian columns, which seemed too low. In this regard, the local workers were hesitant on the subject of the Venetian window: it was practically the first time they were faced with such a structural solution. The problem was solved a few weeks later by placing a small pedestal under the columns that raised the entire system about a meter.

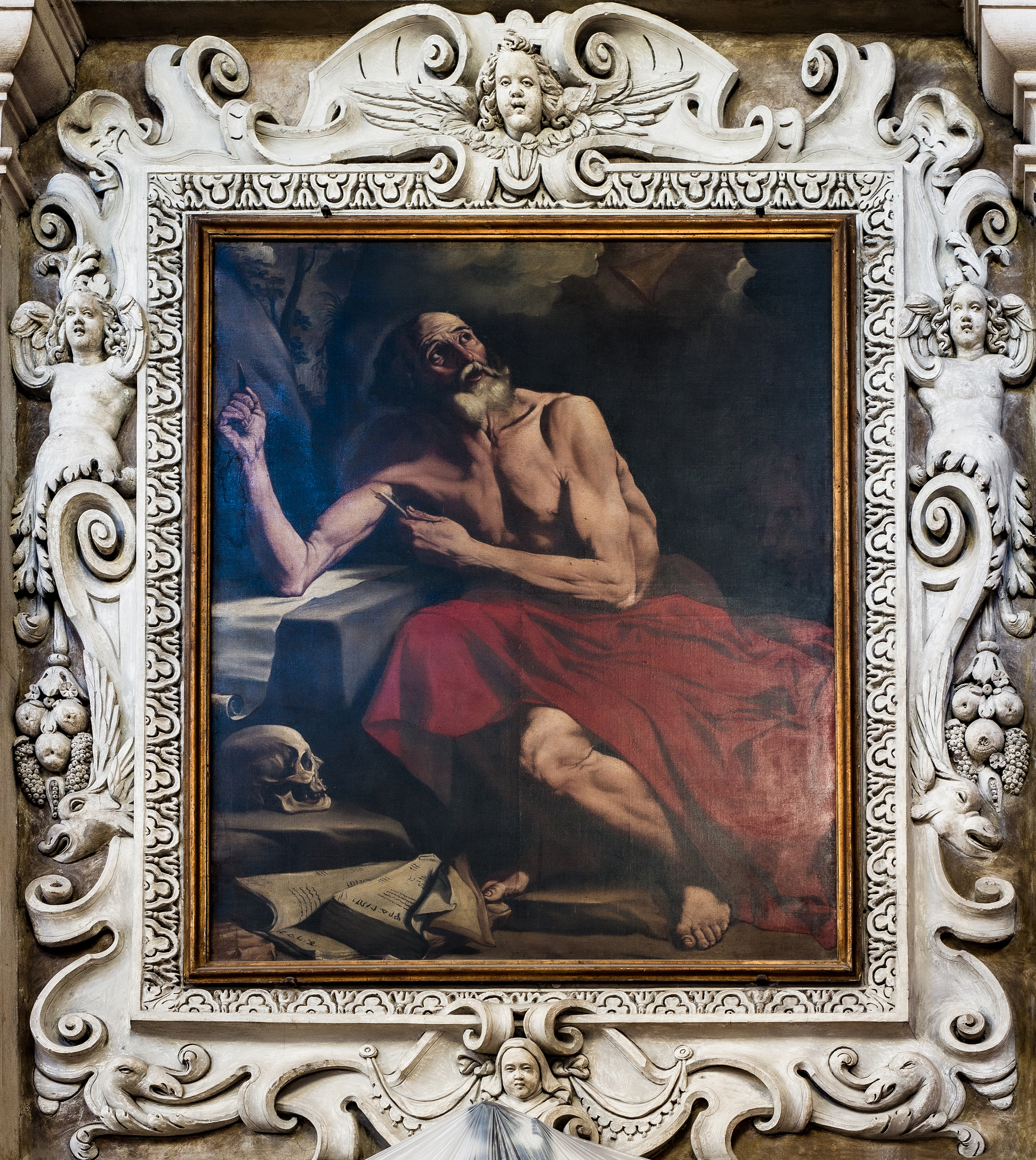
Painting of Penitent Saint Jerome by Andrea Terzi.

In 1622 the rib vaults of the aisles were put in place, and as soon as they were finished, the great vault of the nave was built. Everything seems to be finished in early 1623. In the same year the new sepulchral ark sculpted by Giovanni Antonio Carra was also installed, finding its place in the center of the chancel. A few months later, the bodies of the two saints were finally moved there during a solemn ceremony. Decorations then began to be discussed: on September 5, 1625 a contract was signed with the painters Antonio Gandino and his son Bernardino, who two months later began the drafting of the work in the large panel in the nave. Similarly, in 1626 the painter Tommaso Sandrino began frescoing the rest of the covers starting with the last vault of the right aisle: all work was finished by 1629. In 1630 the tragic "Manzonian plague" occurred, which considerably slowed down the works for at least a decade. Documents mention building works inside the church again only in 1639, when the new ornamentation for the altar of the Blessed Sacrament was commissioned, designed by Agostino Avanzo and made by Giovanni Antonio Carra's sons: Giovanni and Carlo. The affair dragged on quite a bit and the altar could only be finished at the end of the century. In 1643, work began on the rebuilding of the chapel of St. Honorius, at the head of the right aisle, supported financially by the powerful Calini family, which had acquired the sepulchral area in front of it with the commitment to renovate the chapel's furnishings and architecture. Antonio Comino again took care of the matter, but it was to be his last work: the architect died the following year. On the other hand, the construction of the altar of St. Benedict, the third on the left, by Giovanni Carra began in 1649. At the end of the century, the altar of the Nativity was also put in place at the hands of Santo Calegari the Elder: when the work was completed, the canvas by Lattanzio Gambara, made almost a century and a half earlier, was mounted inside it.

=== The 18th century: the new facade and the fire of 1743 ===
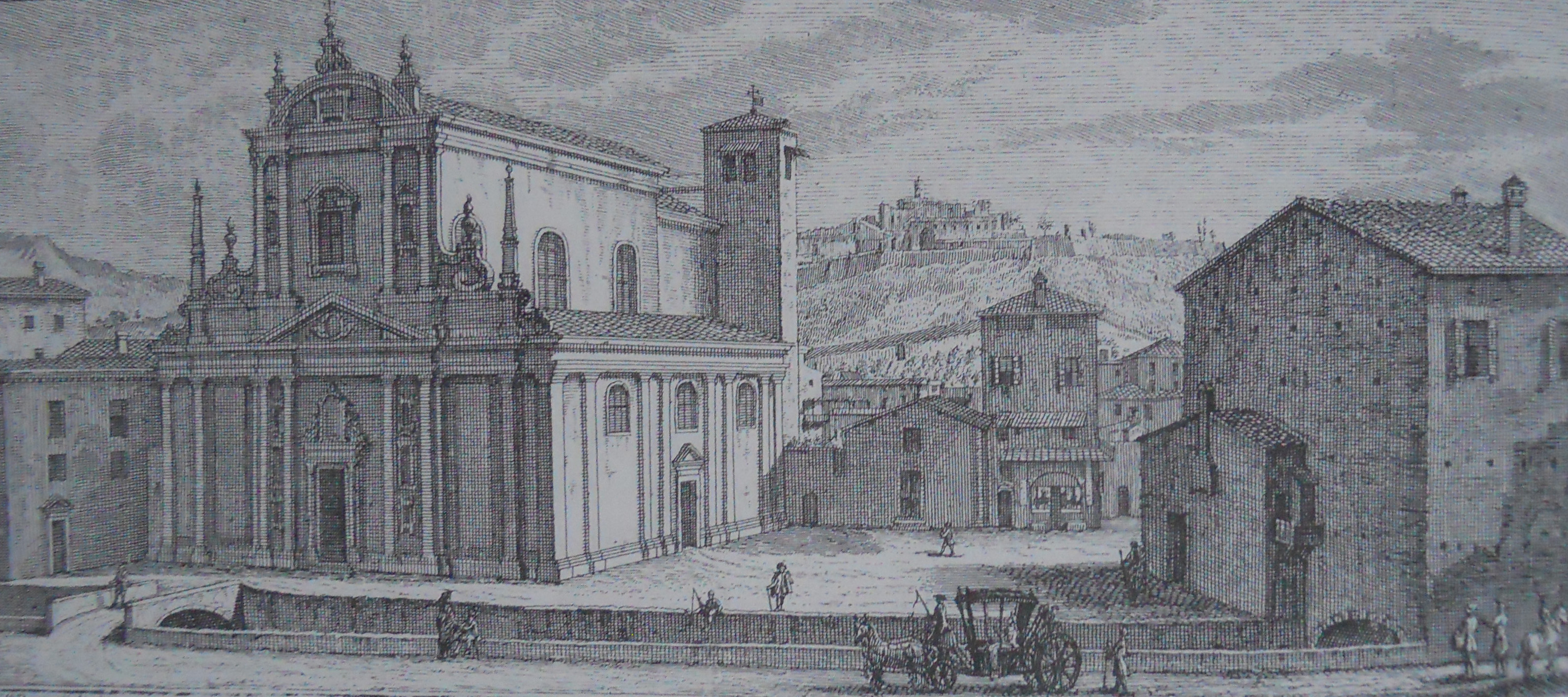
The church in a 1750 engraving by Francesco Battaglioli. The bell tower can be seen in its original form, the oratory of St. James lacking its neoclassical facade, the still uncovered Garza stream, and the old Discipline placed astride the latter, demolished in 1927. The view is to be considered enlarged: the clearing between the church and the Discipline, in front of the oratory, was actually narrower.

Having finished the interior of the church with great success, all that remained was the exterior: the facade, most likely, was still the original Romanesque-Gothic one. The construction of a new, worthy shell for the newly rebuilt interior was subsidized by a substantial testamentary bequest from the nobleman Orazio Fenaroli. The project and construction site were entrusted to Giuseppe Cantone, a well-known local sculptor and stone mason, who had already worked on the interior of the church for the altar of the Blessed Sacrament. Work on the facade began on December 22, 1699, when the first stones of Botticino marble were used to set the base. Between 1701 and 1704 everything else turns out to be placed, including the high relief of the portal carved by Santo Calegari the Elder. However, final completion did not occur until 1711, the date engraved on the upper pediment.

In the meantime, the interior of the church was enriched: the altar of Santa Maria in Silva was built to replace the previous wooden altar, increasing the depth of the chapel in order to have more space, completing the work in 1726. Meanwhile, in 1735 the two large wooden chancels were rebuilt and installed, incorporating the painted cartouches that already adorned the previous chancels. The reason for the rebuilding, however, is not known. The church, at this point truly completed, was to know within a few years a great tragedy.

On the night of December 2, 1743, a great fire occurred in the chancel of the church: the fire was extinguished before it could lead to the collapse of the entire structure, but in the disaster the Antegnati organ, all the seventeenth-century canvases that adorned the walls, the wooden stalls of the chancel, and, above all, the great cycle of frescoes by Lattanzio Gambara were lost. The ark of the titular saints also suffered minor damage at the back, where the great heat had melted the bitumen that welded the inlays to the underlying structure, leading to their detachment. Amid the displeasure of the monks and the populace, the work site that had just been completed apparently had to begin again: the masonry was reassembled and the roof, now burned, rebuilt. Giovanni Battista Carboni designed and carved the new wooden choir stalls. The new organ and its wooden altarpiece were also fabricated and installed. The sepulchral ark was restored, while the vault and walls found a new decoration with the work of Giandomenico Tiepolo. The choir, on the other hand, was repainted by Girolamo Mengozzi. All the works occupied the church for another twenty years or so.

=== The 19th century ===
In 1797, after the collapse of the Venetian Republic, Brescia came under the control of the Brescian Republic, established by local Jacobins following a revolt. The suppression of religious orders also fully affected the monastery of San Faustino, which after nearly a thousand years of existence passed to state property and became military barracks. The church, however, was entrusted to the care of the Franciscans, remaining open and officiated. Parish life was probably saved only because of this: in 1808, Bishop Gabrio Maria Nava invested as provost of St. Faustino, Don Faustino Rossini, who obtained the allocation of part of the monastery for housing the clergy and orderlies. In 1811 it was again Don Faustino who asked for permission to raise the bell tower, which dated from the 11th century and was now low and squat in proportion to the new church. The request was granted, but was not later put into practice, probably for economic reasons.

In 1819, when Don Faustino died, the young Giovanni Battista Lurani Cernuschi took over as head of the parish, to whom is owed the real rebirth of the religious community of Saint Faustino. During his pastorate, which lasted as long as sixty-five years, he put into practice several works of maintenance and beautification of the church. A very important event was a solemn procession organized for the Jubilee of 1826, when the relic of the Holy Cross, kept in the monastery of Santa Giulia until its suppression and then passed to the Cathedral treasury, was brought to the church. Lurani, accompanied by popular enthusiasm, himself requested its custody, for which he offered to have a major new altar built in the church. The request was granted, and already in 1828 the new apparatus was installed in place of the altar of St. Michael, the first on the right. Lurani died in 1884 and, in his memory, the parish dedicated a commemorative monument designed by Antonio Tagliaferri, placed in the last intercolumn of the right colonnade.

In 1831, the wooden compass of the side entrance was built by carpenter Giovanni Gozzoli, decorated with carvings and floral motifs. The artifact was then enriched with a yellow monochrome lunette by Giuseppe Teosa, depicting Jesus driving the merchants out of the temple.

=== The 20th Century ===
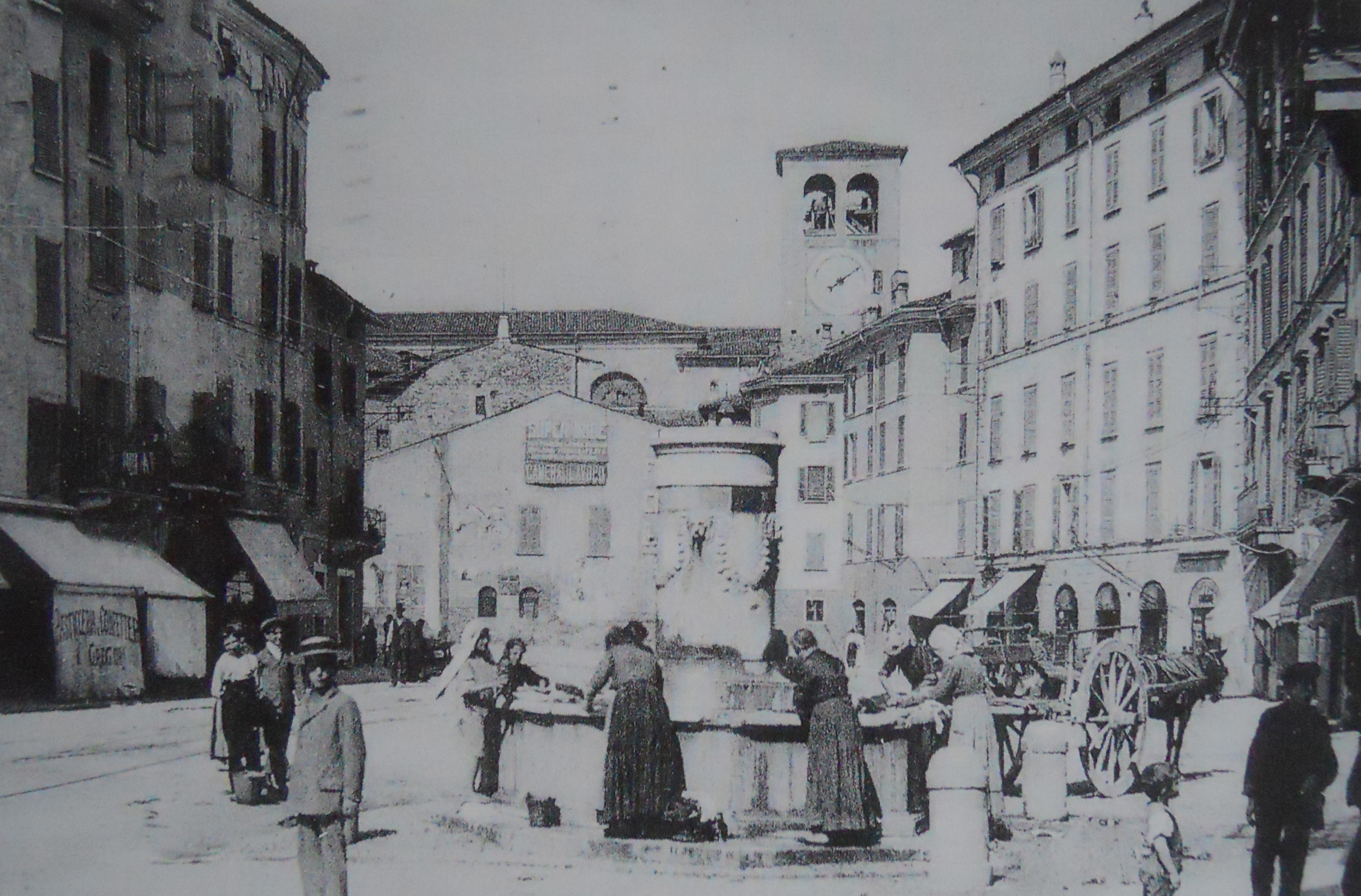
San Faustino Street in a postcard from the 1920s. Clearly visible is the not-yet-elevated bell tower and the side of the church screened by buildings later demolished.

The monastery complex passed the two world wars decidedly unscathed. The only major interventions recorded between the two conflicts were the demolition in 1927 of the old Discipline, a building located south of the church, to widen the street and make way for the streetcar line. This generated the large widening of Via San Faustino on the lateral side of the church, which for the first time appears in frontal view. In 1937, on the other hand, on the occasion of the five-hundredth anniversary of the 1438 miracle, the overhang of the bell tower desired for more than a century was carried out, creating a new belfry with its own openings, above the old one that remains of decorative function.

After the Second World War ended, work was resumed in the church in 1949: the back chapel of the right aisle, until then the chapel of St. Honorius, was modified and converted into a baptistery: the altar and furnishings were dismantled and moved to storage, the saint's relics moved to the mirror chapel of the left aisle, and the only painting present, a canvas by Antonio Gandino, was kept and re-hung on the wall of the new chapel. Finally, in 1952 the new baptismal font, the work of sculptor Claudio Botta, was installed.

In 1957, major archaeological excavations were conducted under the church sacristy: the entire wall of the northern flank of the Romanesque church was brought to light and with it an apse of the crypt demolished in 1601: the wall fragment, about one meter high, was still decorated by the fifteenth-century frescoes commissioned by Abbot Bernardo Marcello. Lower down, however, an earlier decoration emerged, in votive panels with figures of saints. An ancient Roman funerary stele, carved with four figures in a row, three men and a woman, surmounted by a triangular pediment, was also found in the foundations. The work was dismembered and transferred to the Santa Giulia Museum. Another reused Roman stele was also found, consisting only of an inscription. Both finds were dated to the first century.

In 1983, the first technical report had been drawn up on the possibility of transforming the monastery, now freed from military barracks, into the headquarters of the University of Brescia. The project found an immediate start and led to a complete restoration of the structures, which would be concluded in 1997 with the establishment of the administrative and management offices of the university. The restoration process, among other things, became an opportunity to draw up a correct and complete history of the monastery and its church. Between 1998 and 1999, the frescoes of the chancel and choir underwent careful conservation restoration.

=== Events of the 21st century ===
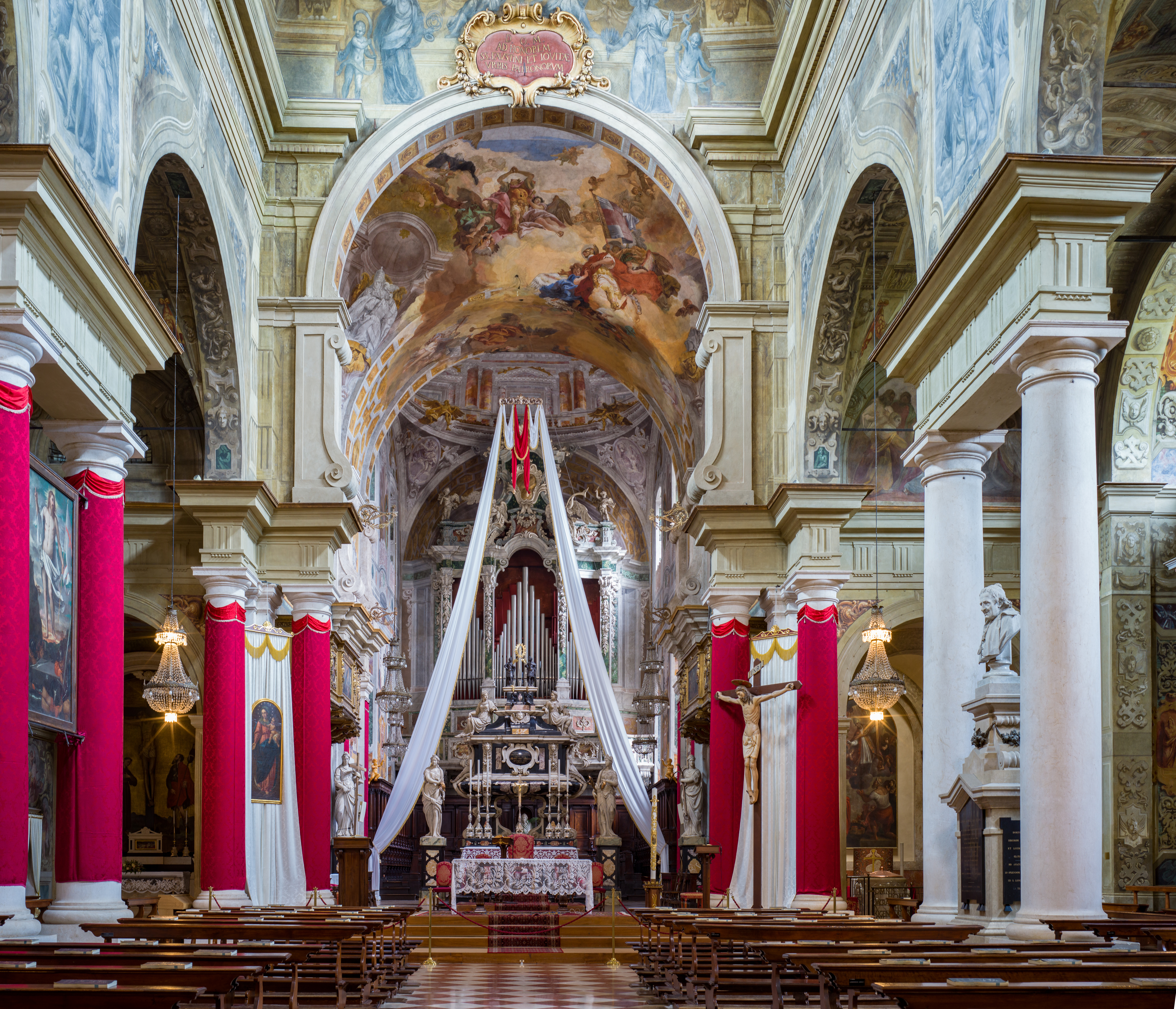
The interior and the high altar

In September 2010 an extensive restoration campaign was completed in the church hall, on the frescoes and furnishings: all the altars were cleaned, as were all the columns and stone pilasters. The operation also involved the frescoes by Tommaso Sandrino, which were fully restored. In parallel, restorations were conducted on various canvases and liturgical furnishings in the church.

At the end of 2010, on the initiative of the parish, the Municipality of Brescia, the Province and the Chamber of Commerce, the Confraternity of Saints Faustino and Giovita, a secular association that had lapsed after 1923, was refounded with the aim of supporting religious initiatives related to the cult of the two martyrs and restoring a spiritual dimension to the patronal feast. One of the first, most important projects concretized by the confraternity was the restoration of the "Ab omni malo," a very old traditional ceremony born in the 10th century and abolished in 1798 by the Brescian Republic: annually, in view of the patron saints' feast day set for February 15, the city administration would ask for the city's protection at the hands of the patron saints, offering the monks wax for the candles. In response, the abbot gave the mayor a cardinal's hat, a symbol sealing the pact. The exchange between the municipality and the church was inspired by the legal institution of the launegildo, provided for in Lombard laws, by which a pact signed by the parties was established to be approved. The tradition was revived on February 6, 2011, when Mayor Adriano Paroli and some representatives of the municipal council handed the parish priest a parchment containing the request for protection during a ceremony. On February 12, a long procession accompanied the parish priest to the Palazzo della Loggia, in front of which he handed the mayor the red galero. The event, according to the mayor's promise, will be re-enacted each administrative term.

== Architecture ==
The architectural structure of the church dates entirely from the first half of the 17th century, when the building was profoundly remodeled. The same applies to the chancel and the choir, which were indeed burned down in 1743 but did not collapse: consequently, only the paintings and some decorative details are of later date, while the structure itself is still the original one.

=== Exterior ===
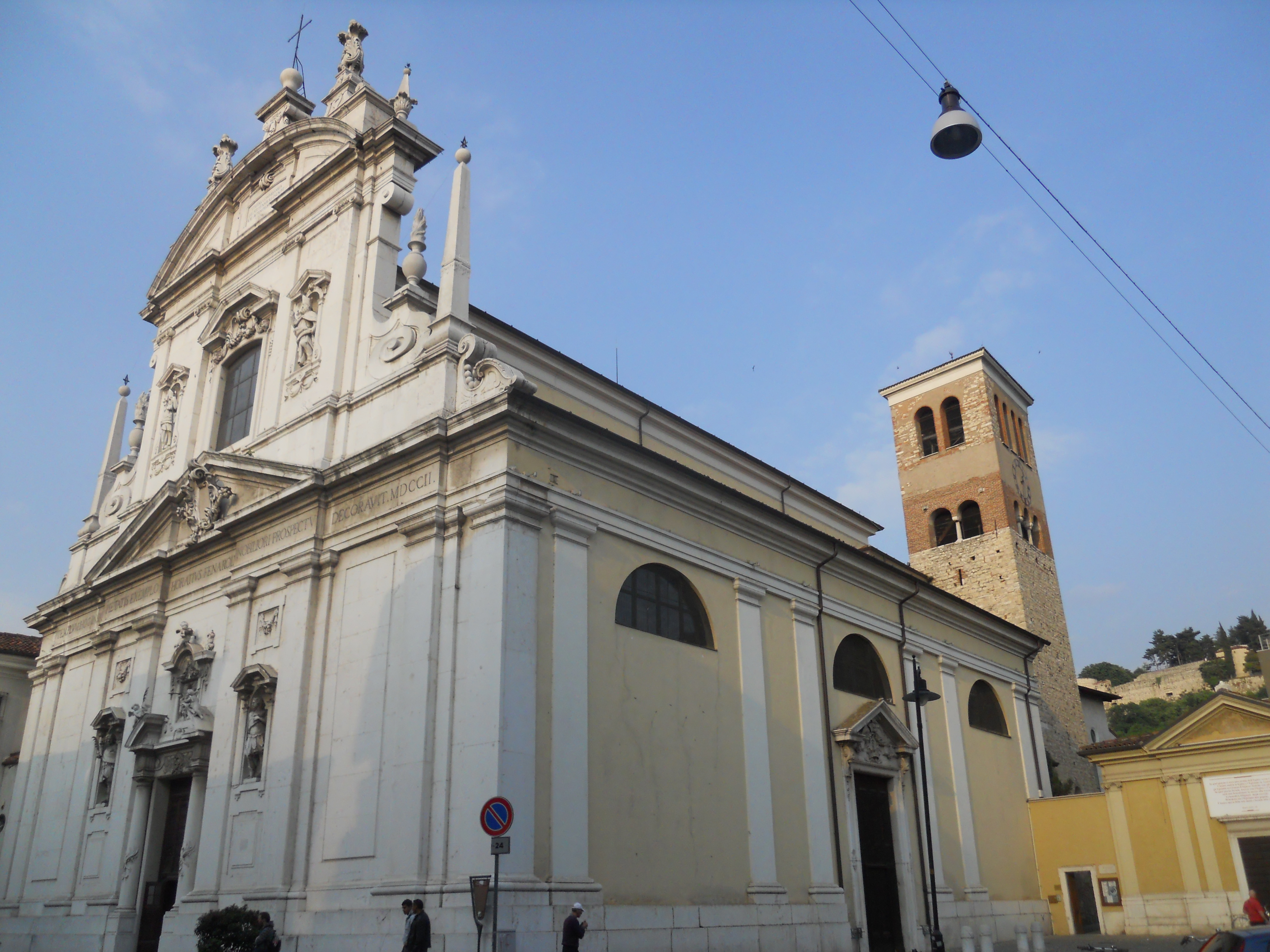
Church, bell tower and former baptistery in an overall view

On the outside, the church is visible from the public street only on the façade and the south side, the latter of which was freed from the pre-existing buildings in 1927 and is therefore evident along its entire length. The presence of an intermediate pitched roof showcases the three-aisle interior layout, while the walls are opened by large lunette windows. Near the apse area, on the widening in front of the side of the church, is the former oratory of St. James, once the church's baptistery, marked by a low neoclassical facade. The bell tower is also clearly visible from the widening, while continuing on to the facade, oriented parallel to the street.

==== The facade by Giuseppe Cantone ====
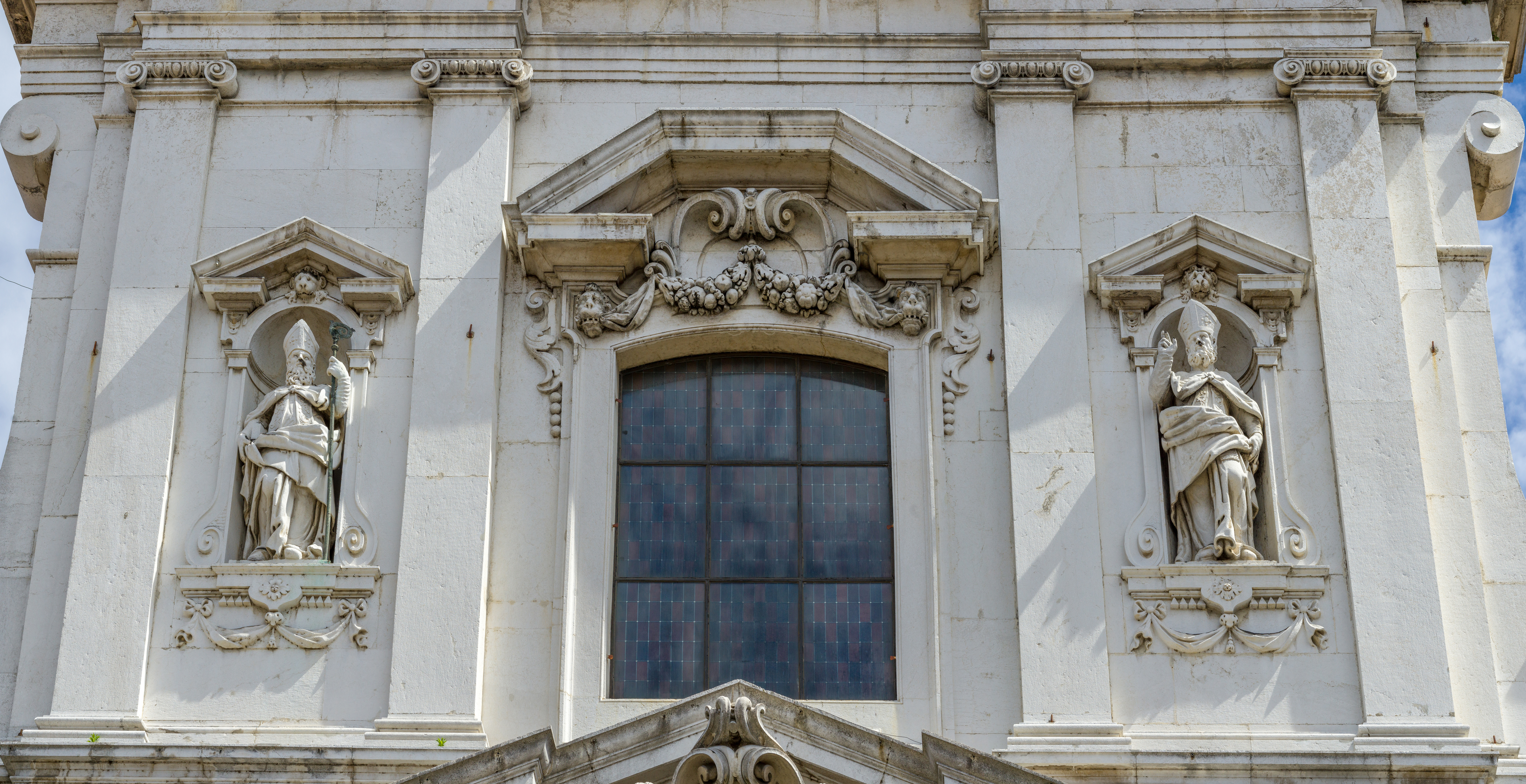
Facade by Giuseppe Cantone of the church of Saints Faustinus and Jovita in Brescia. In the niches statues of St. Antigius on the left and St. Honorius on the right from the school of Calegari

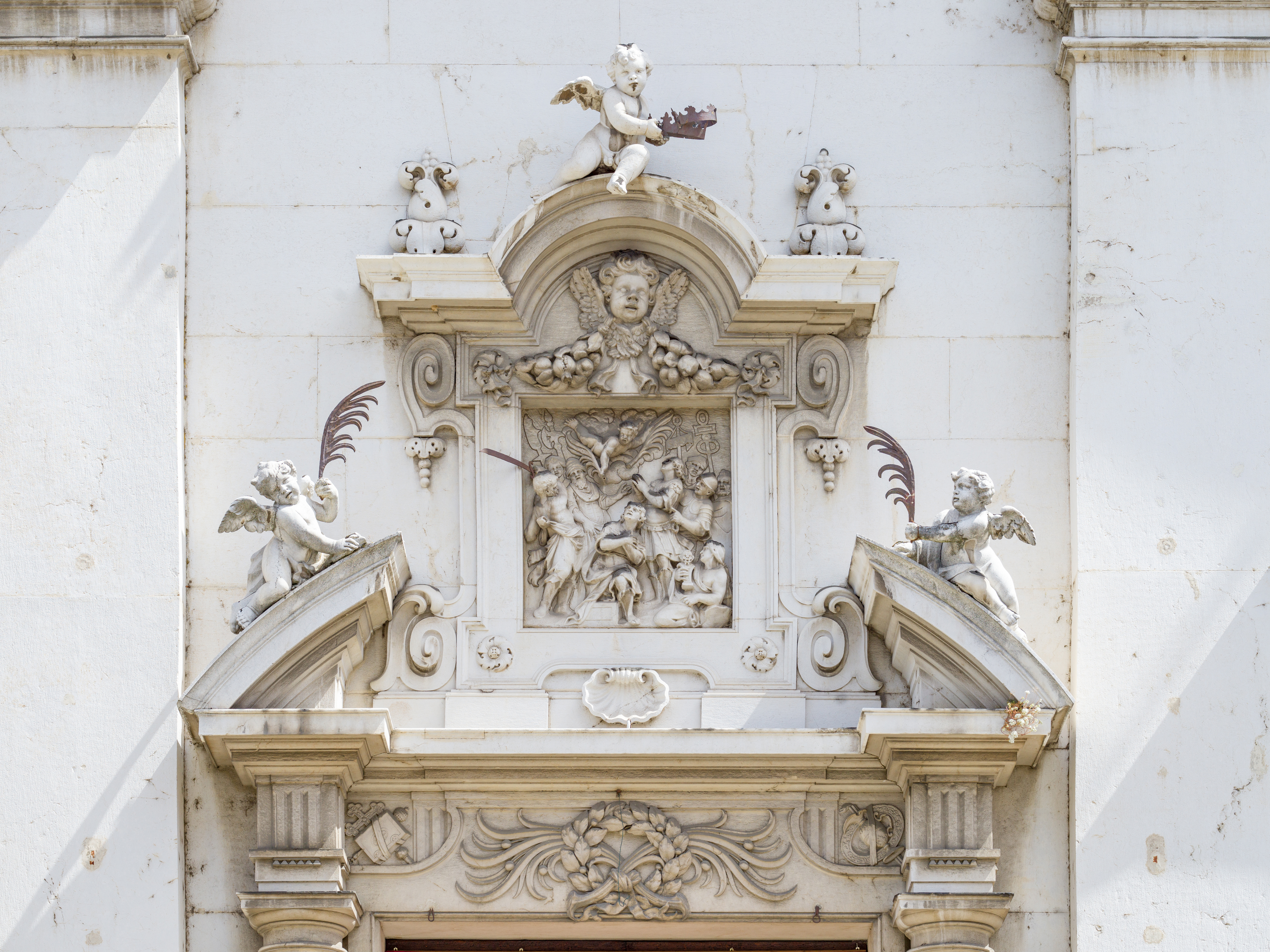
Façade of the Church of Saints Faustinus and Jovita in Brescia - Martyrdom of Saints Faustinus and Jovita by Santo Calegari the Elder, marble high relief with iron inserts, remembered as one of the great masterpieces of Brescian Baroque sculpture.

The facade of the church is the work of Giuseppe Cantone, who designed and built it between 1699 and 1705 with subsequent finishing work completed in 1711. It is considered the best work of the sculptor, who specialized mainly in altar construction. The work is made entirely of Botticino marble. It has two main levels, a wider base level and a narrower upper level. The lower level is decorated by a series of lesenes of Tuscan order, resting on a unified pedestal and supporting an entablature whose frieze is occupied by the dedicatory inscription recalling the fundamental bequest of Orazio Fenaroli, who in fact allowed the construction of the facade. The central part of the lower level, in line with the narrower upper level, projects in slight overhang with a temple-front motif, with four lesenes of the same Tuscan order, entablature and triangular pediment at the top.

The four lesenes are not equidistant, but the central intercolumn is wider to accommodate the entrance portal to the church. Two free-standing Tuscan columns, resting on a high pedestal, frame the opening, while the upper entablature is covered with a rich decoration of plant motifs. This is followed by a low arched pediment immediately broken to allow the elevation of a rich crest, decorated with putti, volutes and floral motifs. In the central panel is the Martyrdom of Saints Faustino and Giovita by Santo Calegari the Elder, a marble high relief with iron inserts, usually remembered as one of the great masterpieces of Brescian Baroque sculpture. Of great effect within the scene is the figure of the executioner completely in relief, whose drawn sword, made of iron, even protrudes outside the frame. In the space between the two lesenes on the side of the portal, on the other hand, statues of the two titular saints, again the work of Santo Calegari, are placed within niches. Inside the upper pediment, on the other hand, is placed a rich Baroque cartouche, one among the pieces made personally by Giuseppe Cantone.

This is followed by the second level of the facade, which is imposed on the first by means of a unified pedestal. In line with the overhanging part below rises the main body of the second level, decorated by four lesenes of Ionic order surmounted by an entablature and a low arched pediment, which concludes the facade. Again, the four pilasters are not equidistant, but the central, wider space is occupied by a large window decorated with a rich cymatium, while the two side spaces house two other niches containing the statues of St. Antigius on the left and St. Honorius on the right. The two works are attributed to the workshop of the Calegari. The two levels of the facade are connected by two very flattened and lowered side volutes, an invention of Cantone. The large upper pediment is crowned by five pinnacles with architectural and plant motifs, among which the central one, the highest, is concluded by an iron cross.

==== The bell tower ====
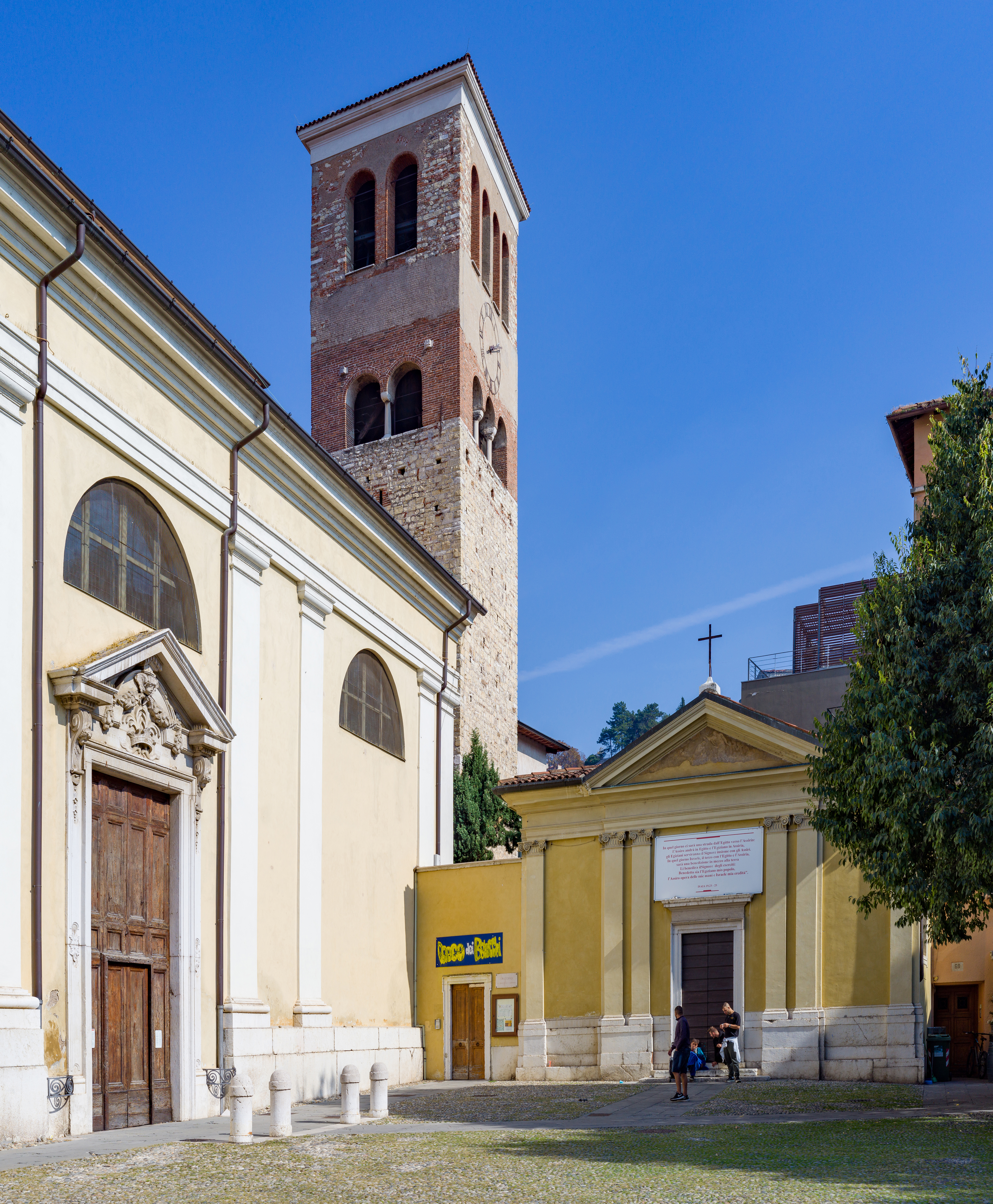
The bell tower

The bell tower of the church, clearly visible from the outside, is practically the only part of the church that was not touched during the reconstruction work conducted in the seventeenth century. Even from the fire of 1743 the structure emerged intact. Only in 1937, on the occasion of the five-hundredth anniversary of the 1438 miracle, would the tower be modified by means of a superelevation, which had already been desired for more than a century, and which also involved a revision of the openings.

Dating back to the ninth century, the bell tower of the Church of Saints Faustinus and Jovita is the oldest in the city. To this phase belongs the entire first layer made of medolo blocks, a local whitish stone. The old brick belfry above, on the other hand, dates back to an early restoration in the 12th century and has two biforas on the short sides, facing east and west, and two triforas on the long sides, facing north and south. The bell tower, in fact, has a rectangular plan. However, only the two biforas are original: when the overhang was carried out in 1937, the biforas on the long sides were restored and converted into triforas, to make the bell tower's profile more harmonious. Of the two dividing mullions, therefore, only one is original and the other was specially reconstructed.

Beyond the ancient belfry then rises the present one, fabricated as an ancient wall face from variously arranged blocks of stone and brick. On the crowning, two biforas open again on the short sides and, instead, two quadriforas on the long ones. The openings are carved directly into the masonry, without median dividing mullions. Covering the tower is a roof with a very slight cusp, on the top of which is a copy of Ramperto's rooster. The bell tower houses 9 bells in D3 (D4, C#4, C4, B3, A3, G3, F#3, E3 and D3) plus the call bell in D4; the C4 is used in the 5-bell concert in G3.

=== Interior ===
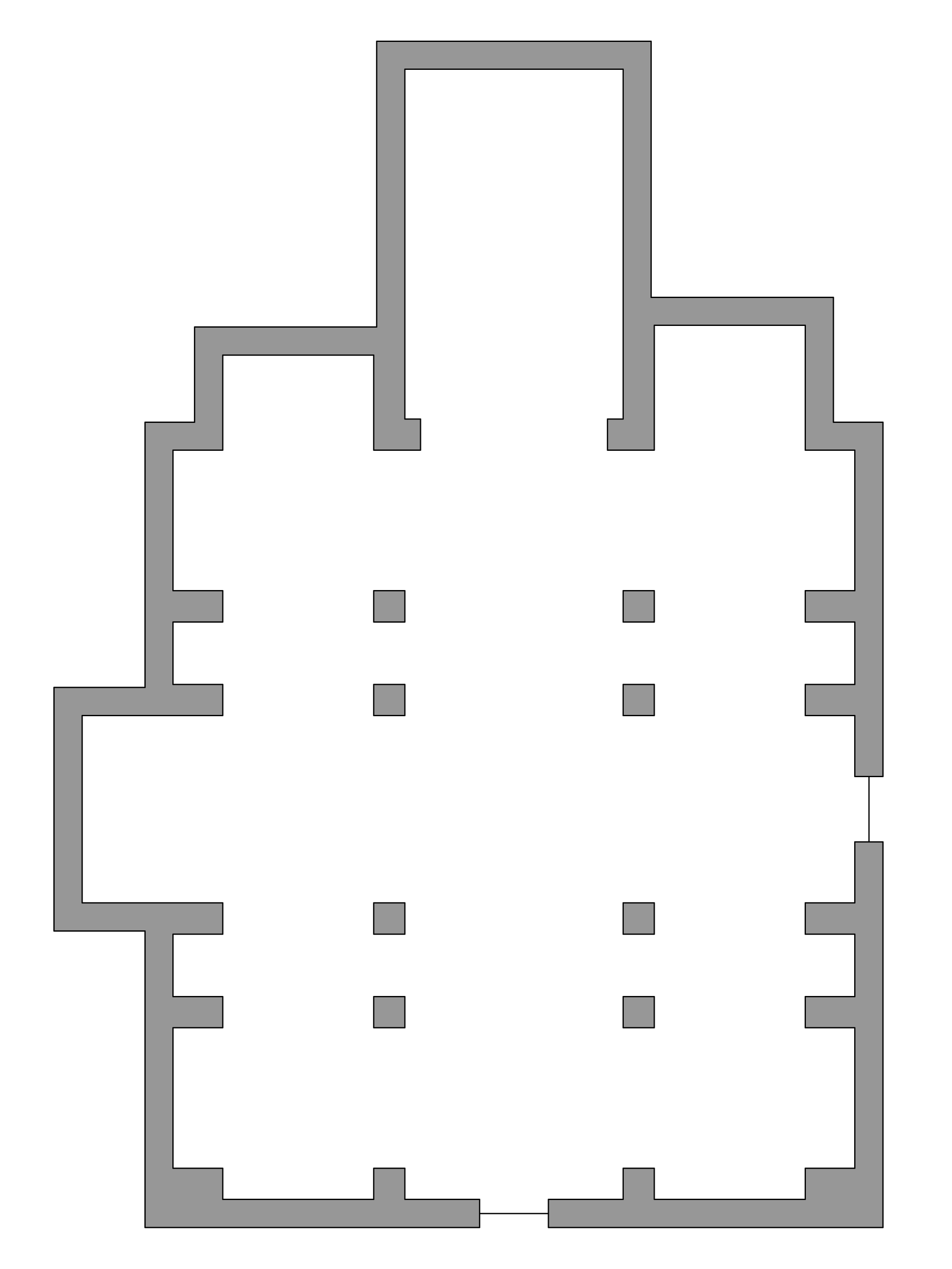
Interior floor plan

The interior of the church is remarkably tall and wide, a feature also helped by the visual effect of the two serlian colonnades, which greatly dilate the space. The building has a three-nave plan with no transept, the central one wider and taller and the side aisles smaller in size. At the back of the nave rises on a few steps the chancel, concluded by the high altar and followed by the choir, which resolves into a flat apse. At the perimeter walls of the aisles are placed a total of five altars, three on the left and only two on the right, since the central space for the ideal third altar is occupied by the secondary entrance to the church. Finally, two more chapels open on the end heads of the two aisles.

In the elevations, as already mentioned, the church is strongly characterized by the use of the serlian motif of the two dividing colonnades, consisting of free standing columns of Tuscan order. The columns do not rest directly on the pavement, but a dado is placed between them, inserted by designer Antonio Comino in response to the hesitations of local workers who feared installing columns that were too low and statically dangerous. The columns, six on each side, are consistently projected onto the side walls by lesenes. The lesenes on the walls of the side aisles that respond to this composition, moreover, predate the colonnade by about fifty years, being those already designed and made by Giovanni Maria Piantavigna in the late sixteenth century and later reused for the purpose.

Above the colonnade runs an entablature properly decorated with metopes and triglyphs, which serves as the impost for the large central covering vault. This is a particular version of the barrel vault, that is, a barrel vault that at both ends becomes a cloister vault, closing in on itself, avoiding the presence of the flat heads. The two aisles, on the other hand, are covered by a series of light rib vaults. The chancel and apse, on the other hand, are covered by two sequential ribbed vaults.

== Works ==
The church of Saints Faustinus and Jovita houses numerous pictorial and sculptural works, a remarkable testimony to early 17th-century Brescian art in the fields of decoration, painting and sculpture, which reaches a particularly high level of quality in certain pieces such as the sepulchral ark of the two titular saints, the altars of St. Benedict and the Nativity, the chancels and the confessionals. These works are then joined by Sandrino's frescoes and Tiepolo's work, the latter from the 18th century. Practically absent, on the other hand, are artistic evidences of earlier periods, for example, of Gothic art or Romanesque art, which have completely disappeared from the artistic treasury of San Faustino.

=== Frescoes ===
==== The frescoes of the naves ====
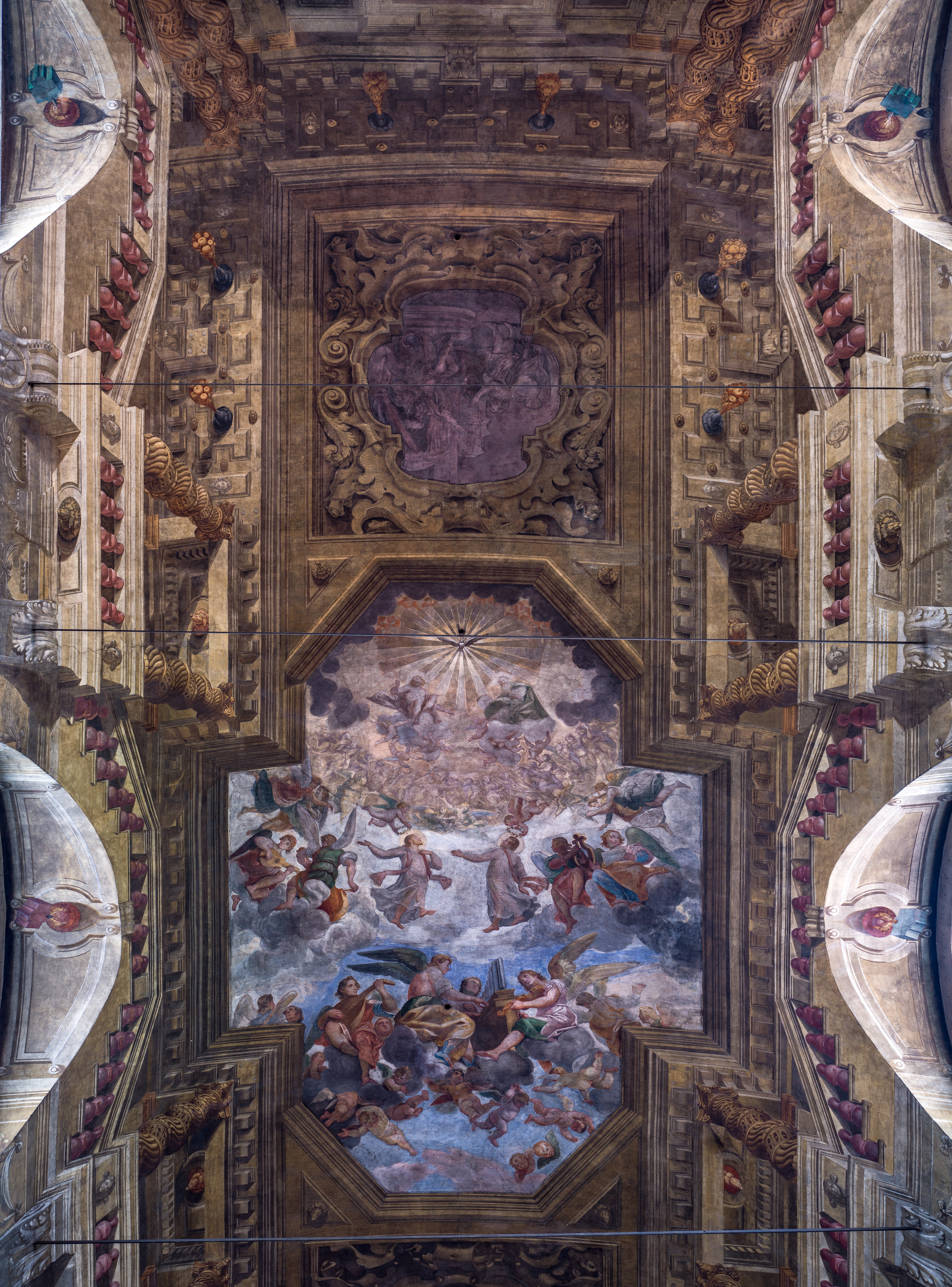
The central vault fresco is the work of Tommaso Sandrino. The central panel, on the other hand, is the work of Antonio and Bernardino Gandino.

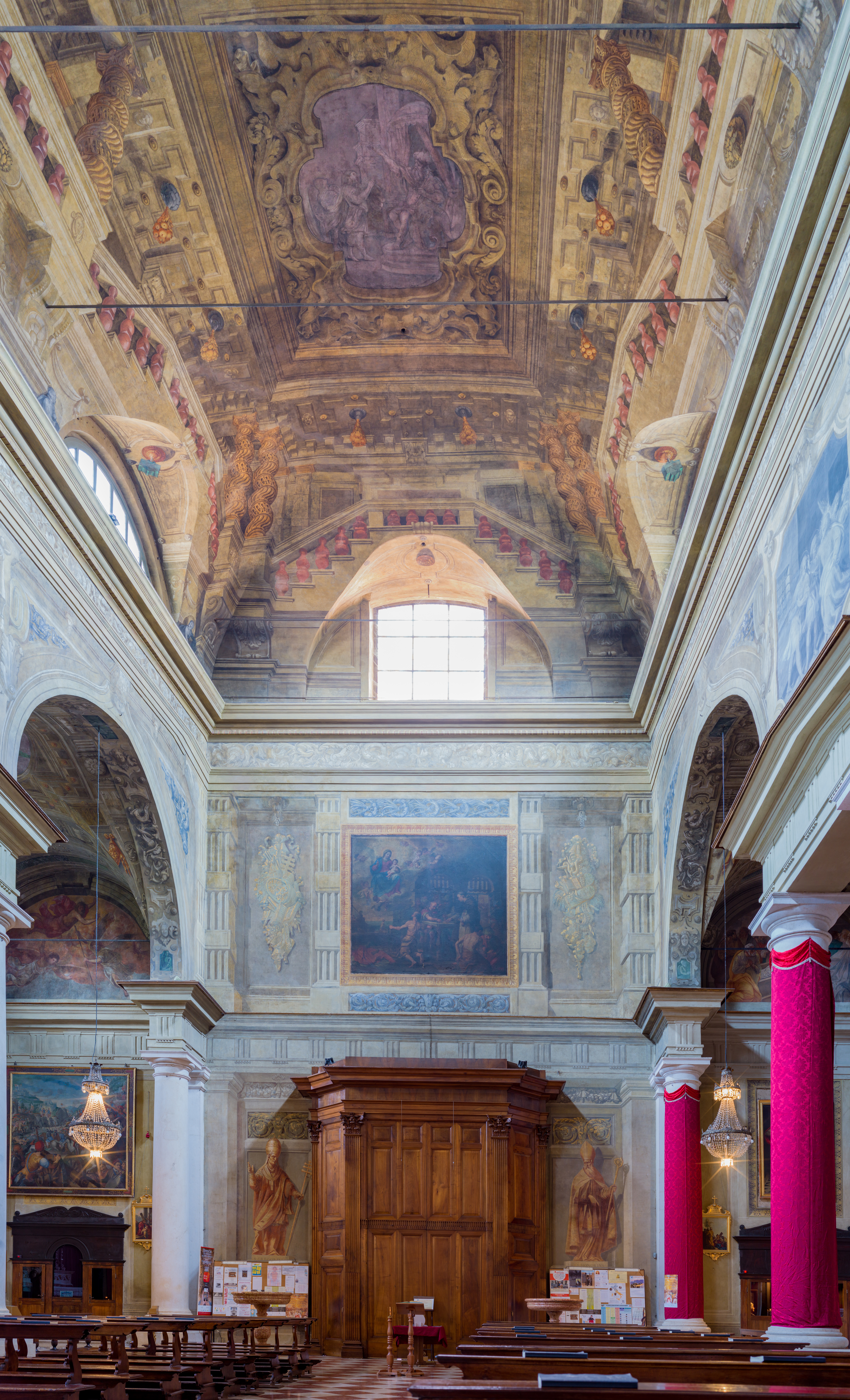
The counterfacade

All the ceilings of the hall, both the central and side vaults, are completely frescoed with the illusionistic architecture of Tommaso Sandrino, complemented by scenes by other authors. The extensive fresco on the nave consists of a continuous balustrade, supported by corbels, on which rest mighty Solomonic columns supporting a false ceiling, ideally higher and deeper than the real one. The basic balustrade is not linear, but follows a continuous ascent and descent of faux staircases that bypass the open lunette windows at the base of the vault. Finally, the whole is largely embellished with various decorations and architectural motifs. The work of Antonio Gandino and his son Bernardino is the large central panel, depicting the Glory of the martyred saints Faustinus and Jovita. The fresco depicts the two saints as they ascend to heaven in the presence of the Trinity amid a riot of musician angels. The two ascending saints wear transparent, fluttering white robes and wear stoles in the manner of the priestly Faustinus and the diaconal Jovita, so as to make specific the identity of each according to the data of tradition.

By contrast, the work of Camillo Rama are the four large gray monochrome panels placed on the wall of the nave above the twin columns of the serlian colonnade. They depict Episodes of the legendary journey of Saints Faustinus and Jovita: the panel with the inscription "Brixiae" shows them comforted by Jesus during their imprisonment, rescued by angels in the panels with the inscription "Mediolani" and "Neapoli," and rescued from the beasts of the Colosseum in the one with the inscription "Romae."

As mentioned, the ceilings of the side aisles, covered by cross vaults in succession, are also frescoed by Tommaso Sandrino, who arranged calibrated architectural spaces where the narrative panels, the work of Camillo Rama and Antonio Gandino, could be inserted. In the right aisle are placed, starting from the counter-façade, Angels in Glory with censers, the Martyrdom at the Easel of the patron saints, and a group of Musician Angels. The left aisle, in the same sequence, is decorated by the Assumption of Mary probably by Ottavio Viviani, the Ascension of Jesus, and Saint Benedict in Glory.

By Ottavio Amigoni are the two large figures of St. Gregory the Great and St. Honorius frescoed on the counter-facade wall on either side of the main entrance.

==== Presbytery and chancel ====
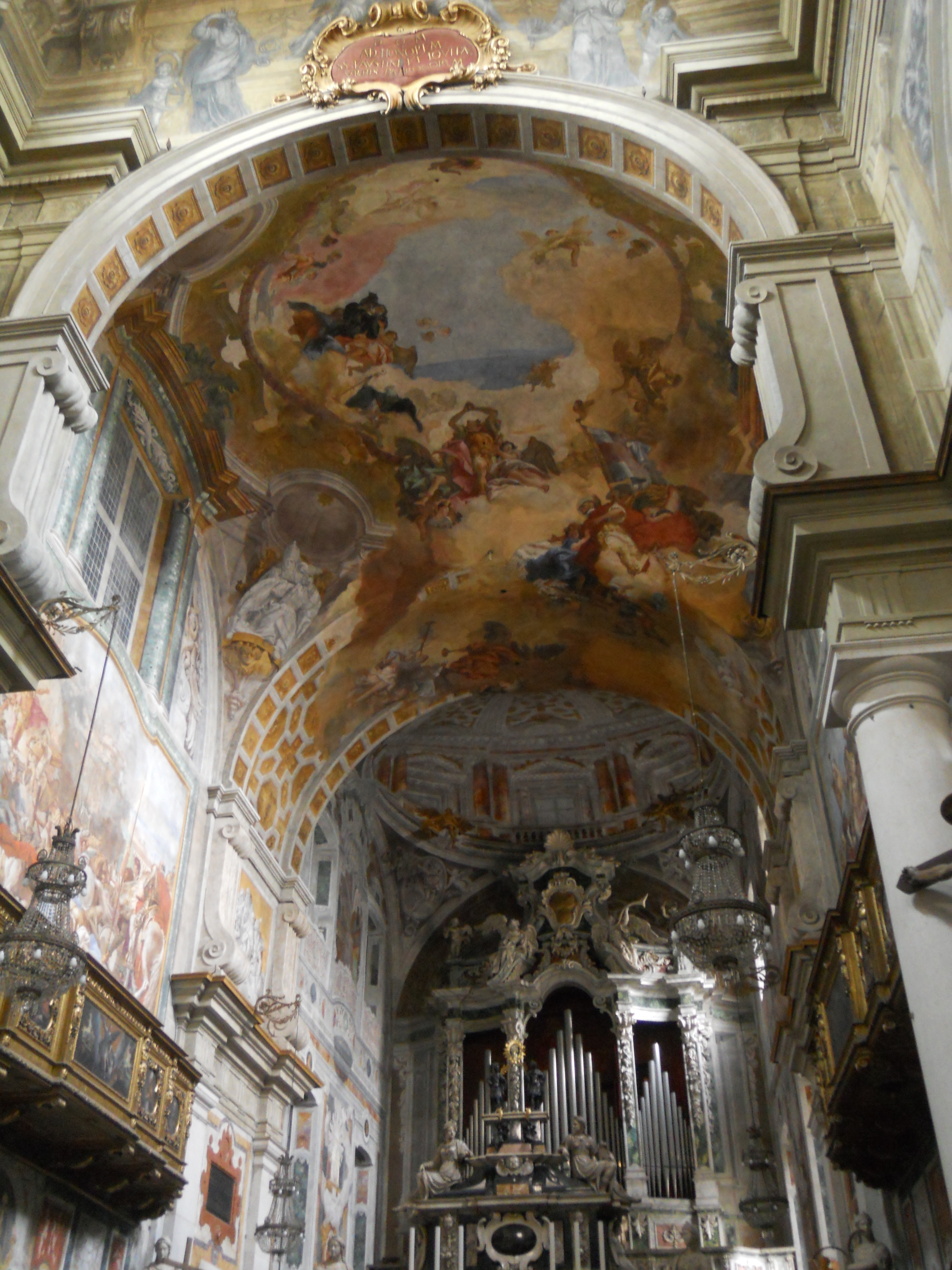
View of the chancel frescoes

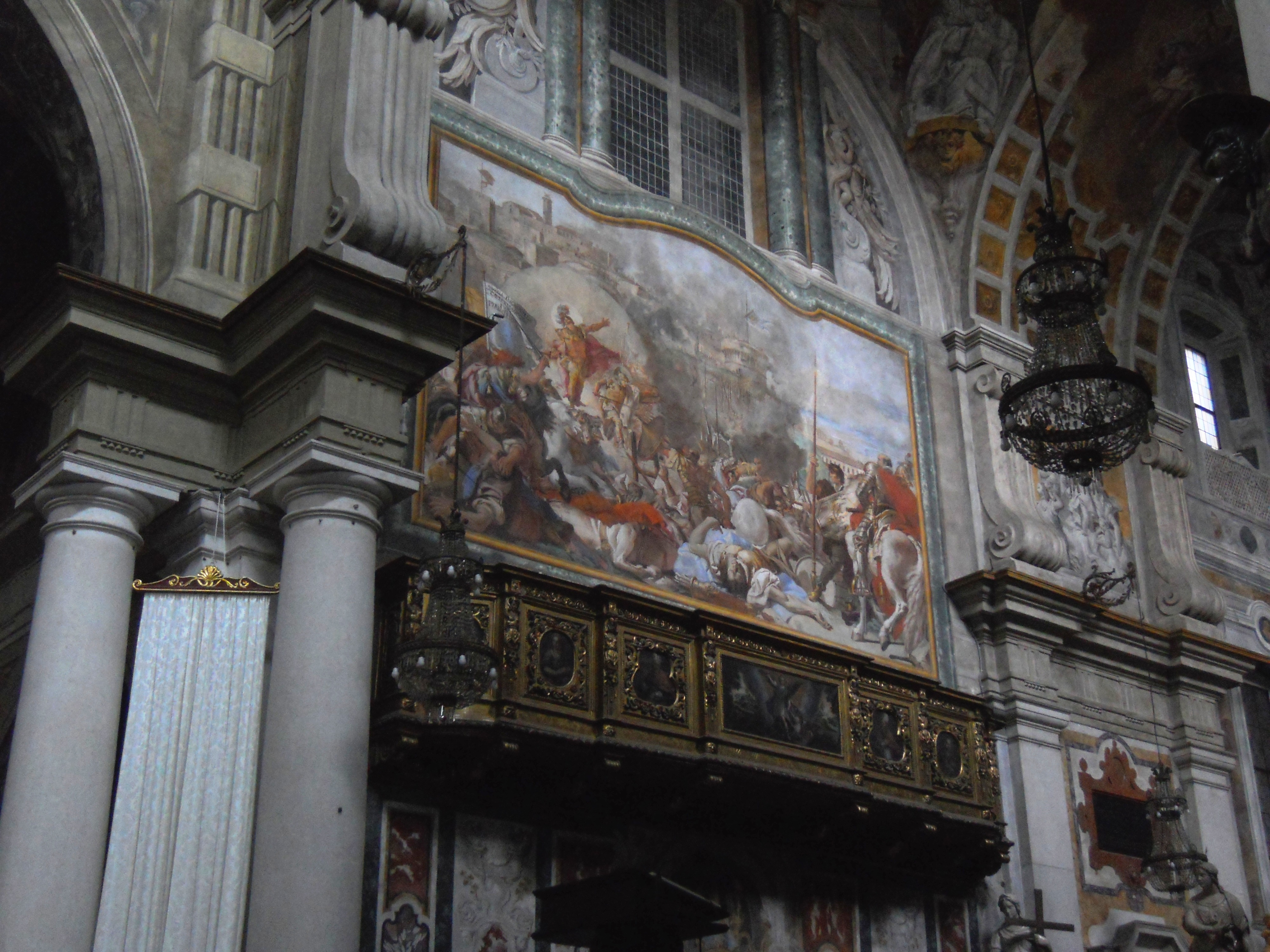
One of the side frescoes

The decoration on the vault and walls of the chancel and choir was done by Giandomenico Tiepolo and Girolamo Mingozzi after the 1743 fire that had destroyed Lattanzio Gambara's cycle.

Tiepolo's fresco depicts the Apotheosis of Saints Faustinus, Jovita, Benedict, and Scholastica: the four saints are arranged along a common line that, from below, gradually rises upward following a slight curvature in the final section, then culminating near heaven, depicted in the center by means of a perspective breakthrough. First is Saint Faustinus followed by Saint Jovita, titulars of the church and patrons of the city. The third figure is Saint Benedict, while Saint Scholastica closes the sequence. Each saint is led to heaven by a tangle of angels, clouds, and banners, clearly evident around Saint Faustinus, more faint as one ascends, while other celestial figures fly scattered around the scene.

The figuration, instead of being resolved in the faux perspective breakthrough of the covering sail vault, where the sky is placed, escapes through a well-organized solution, where the clouds of the sky, on which the angels hover, "cover" with skillful perspective illusion a large area of the surrounding faux architecture, that is, the coffered intrados of the archway supporting the vault, part of the entablature and the cymatiums that form the perimeter of the central perspective breakthrough and also one of the statues on the pendentives. Surrounding the central scene are precisely these decorations, partially covered, and the four faux statues, in which the four Fathers of the Latin Church are represented in monochrome: St. Gregory the Great, St. Augustine, St. Ambrose, and St. Jerome. The figure of the latter is the one covered by the "cloud" that descends from the center of the vault and is recognizable only through the lion, symbol of the saint, which can be glimpsed at the base of the fictitious pedestal.

Giandomenico Tiepolo's work, in addition to the vault of the presbytery, also includes the two perimeter walls below, where the painter places two large frescoes centered on fundamental scenes of the cult of the titular saints: the Martyrdom of Saints Faustinus and Jovita and the Intervention of the patron saints in defense of Brescia besieged by Nicolò Piccinino. The former depicts, precisely, the instant when the two saints were martyred, just outside the city walls; the latter depicts the appearance of the two saints on the Roverotto terraces during the 1438 siege, which put the Milanese army led by Niccolò Piccinino to flight.

The fresco decorations on the walls and ceiling of the choir are the work of Girolamo Mingozzi, made most likely in the same years when Tiepolo was working on the adjacent walls, thus between 1754 and 1755. The hypothesis is deduced from the fact that the faux coffered ceiling covered by Tiepolo's clouds is his work, so it is likely that the two frescoes were made at the same time. The other paintings by Mingozzi are the faux dome supported by columns painted on the apsidal ribbed vault, the four medallions with the symbols of the evangelists in the faux pendentives, and the decoration of the two side walls, where the painter places faux tribunes equipped with railing and half-open doors, from which some figures look out. There are also clouds of three-dimensional consistency, endowed with their own shadows and with fluttering angels, which surround the various elements and emerge from the frames, a clear reference to Tiepolo's great illusory decoration that opens a few meters away. Colonna's work is also the decoration of the walls under the chancels, where he painted realistic niches containing fake marble cartouches bearing the figure of St. Benedict on the left and St. Scholastica on the right, all accompanied on the sides by geometric and floral motifs.

=== Altars and side chapels ===
The church houses, as mentioned above, six side altars: five are in the aisles, the sixth is in the back chapel of the left aisle. The mirror chapel at the head of the right aisle, on the other hand, serves as the baptistery. Among the altars, two (St. Benedict and Crucifix) date from the first half of the seventeenth century and, therefore, from the major reconstruction site of the church, two (Nativity and Blessed Sacrament) from the second half of the century, one (St. Mary in Silva) from the eighteenth century, and the last (Holy Cross) from the nineteenth century.

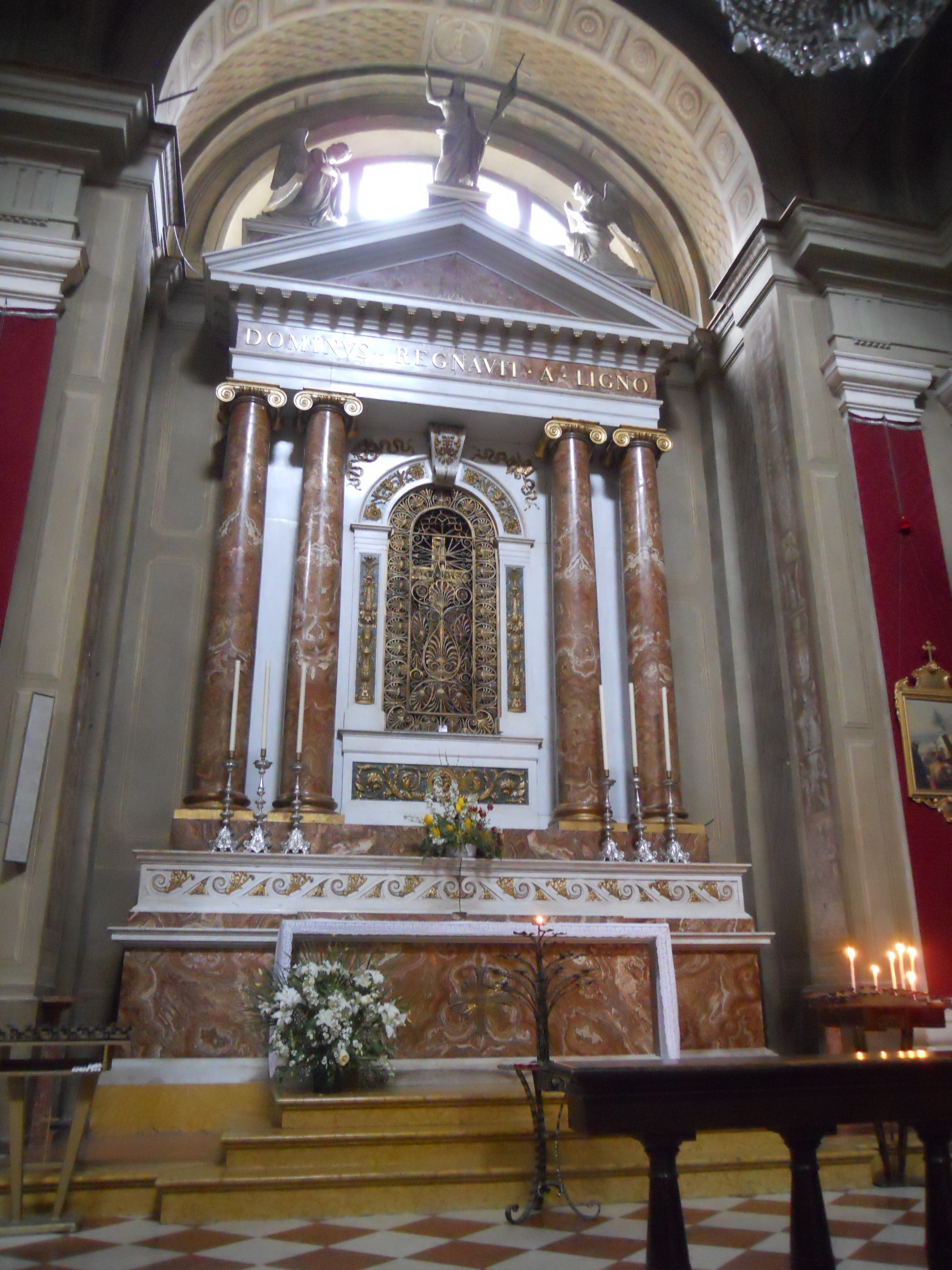
Altar of the Holy Cross

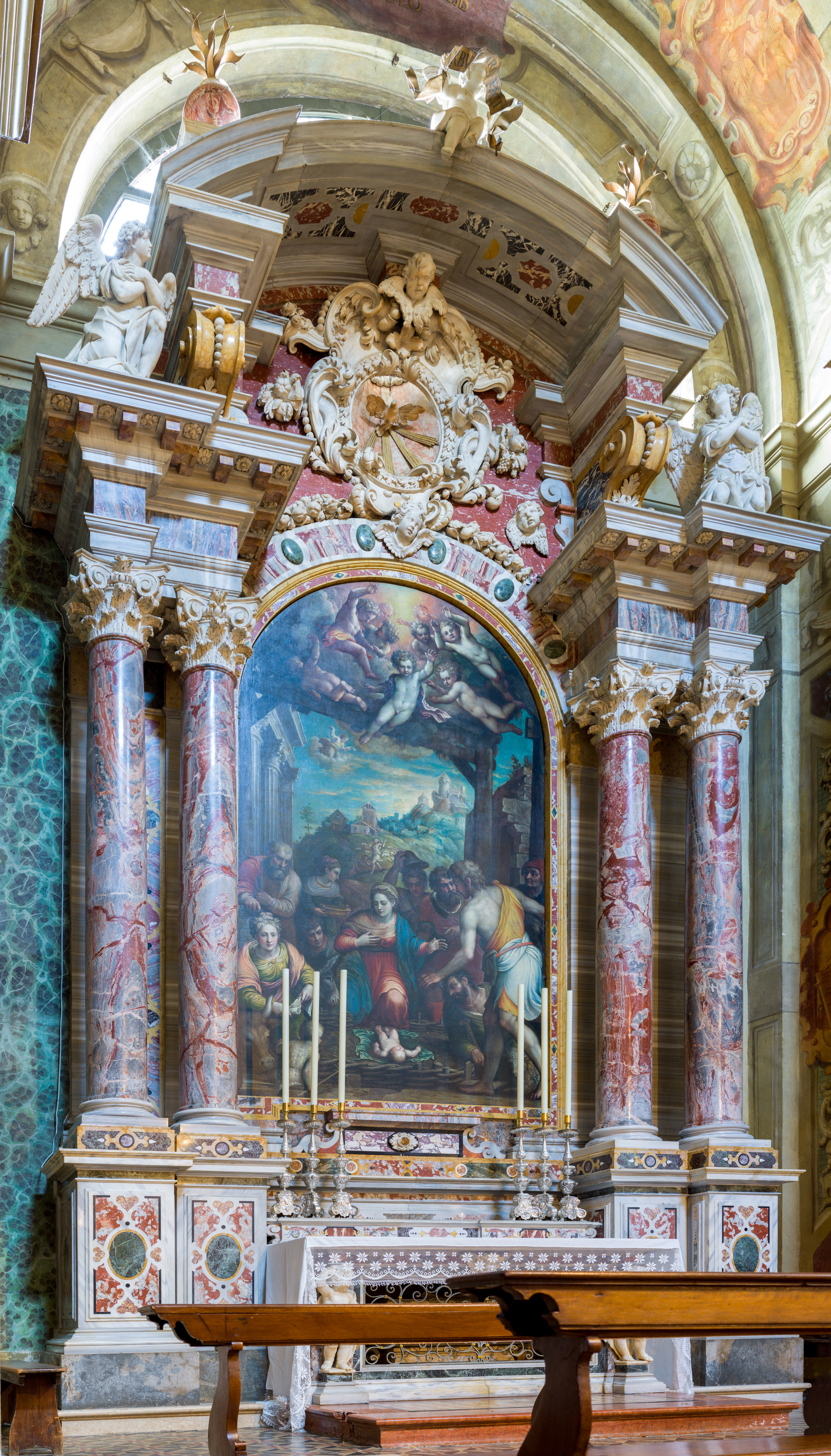
Altar of the Nativity

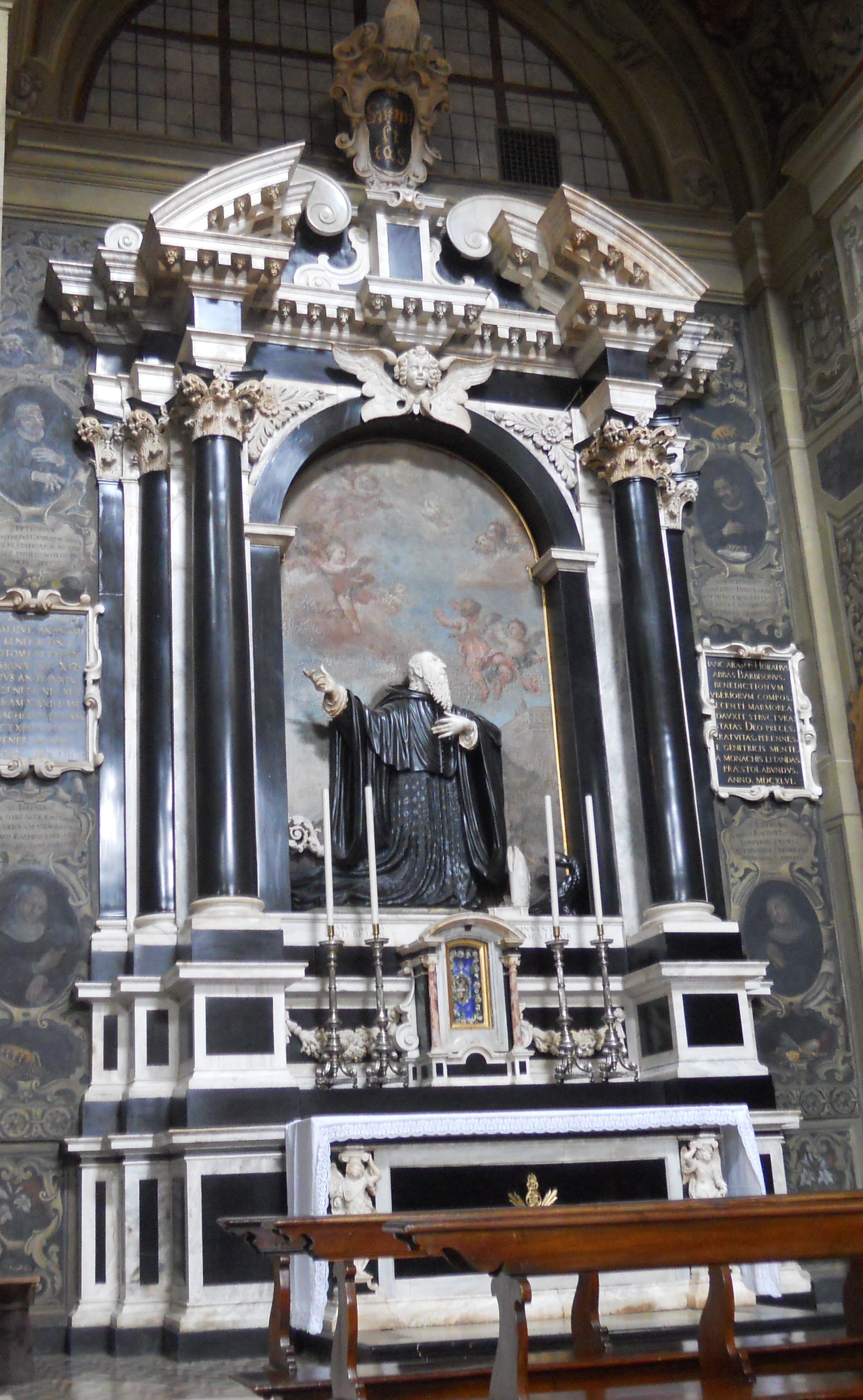
Altar of St. Benedict

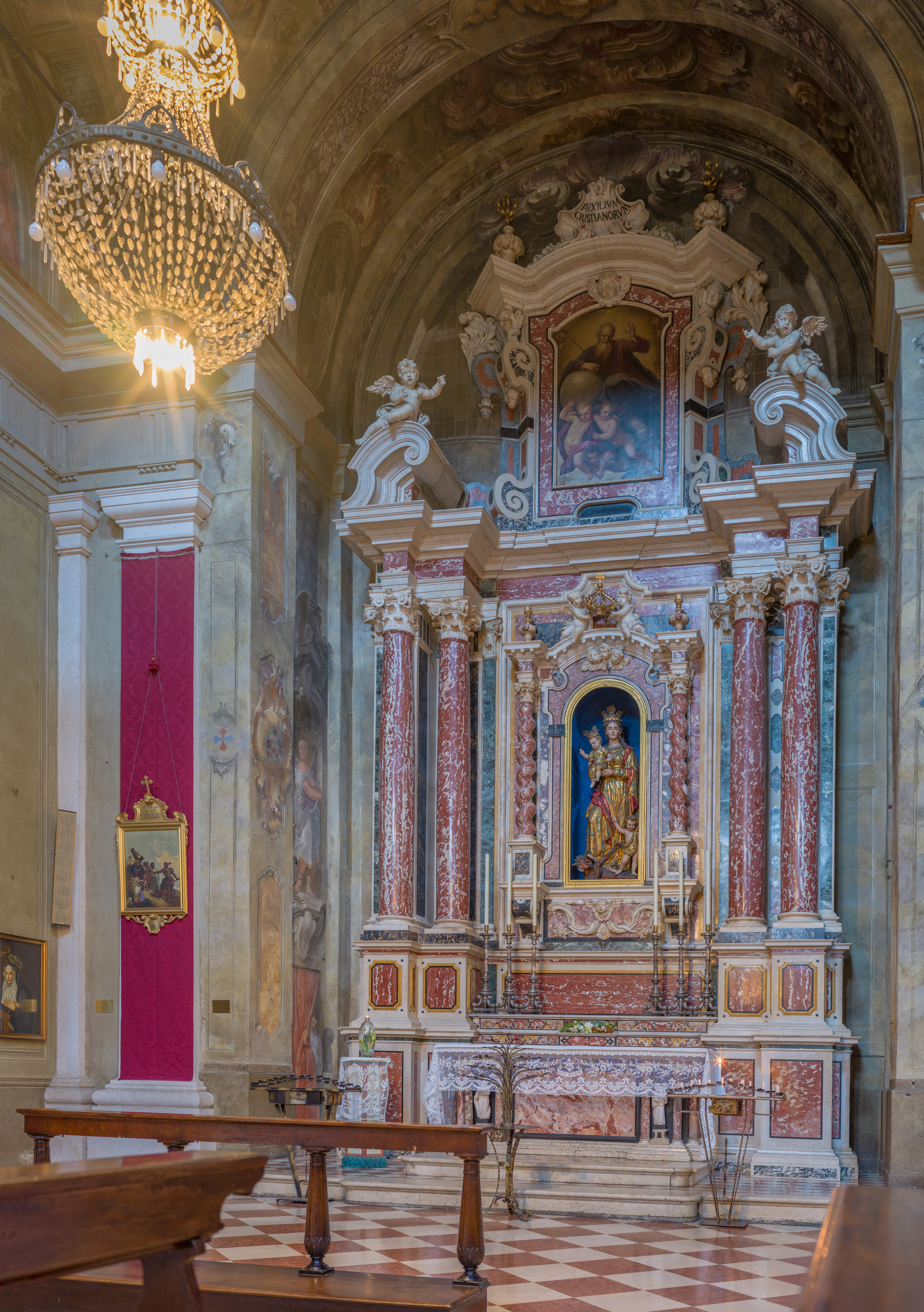
Altar of Santa Maria in Silva

Altar of the Holy Cross

It was built in 1828, replacing the previous one, to accommodate a relic of the True Cross given to the parish in 1826. The author is unknown, and the attribution to Rodolfo Vantini is not supported by archival sources, although it is likely that the leading Brescian architect of the time was called for such an important role for an altar. The altar is set on lines markedly of neoclassical art, and the elegance of the composition, already remarkable for the alternation of pinkish breccia and white marble, is reinforced by the numerous gilded inserts that complement the high refinement of the colors. The center of the altarpiece is occupied by a niche where, enclosed by a grille, is kept the large crucifix-shaped reliquary containing the relic.

The latter is not the original but was fabricated from scratch for the altar: the original reliquary, dating from the late 15th century, is kept in the church treasury. On the other hand, crowning the altar is a sculptural group by Gaetano Matteo Monti, with two kneeling side angels and the risen Christ in the center, characterized by a strong neoclassical academic rigor.

Altar of the Nativity

The altar consists of a large Baroque scenographic apparatus, completely assigned to the hand of Santo Calegari the Elder. The composition is dynamic and elegant, both in terms of the architectural solutions adopted and the profusion of polychrome marble. It serves as the antependium the funerary urn of St. Antigius, engraved with the dedication "S. Antigius / Ep.", closed by a grill. The altarpiece, on the other hand, is the large Nativity of Jesus by Lattanzio Gambara, generally considered among his masterpieces.

Baptistery

The chapel at the head of the right aisle is the church's baptistery, obtained by reconstructing the former chapel dedicated to St. Honorius in 1949. In the center is the baptismal font, made in 1952 by sculptor Claudio Botta. It is a cylindrical basin banded with a continuous frieze in high relief, centered on the figure of Christ rising from the tomb, whose stone is raised by four angels.

The three side walls were intended to be covered with frescoes, which were eventually never realized. The left wall houses a painting by Amedeo Bocchi depicting The Baptism of Jesus at the Jordan, while on the back wall hangs the altarpiece of the original altar disassembled in 1949, the work of Bernardino Gandino and made after 1646, depicting Saint Honorius in the clouds surrounded by angels in the presence of members of the Calini family, who had financially supported the rebuilding of the chapel in the seventeenth century. In front of the chapel, the floor plaque of Cardinal Ludovico Calini, the main financier of the reconstruction, still stands. In the chapel, after 1601 and for about two decades, there also remained the triptych of St. Honorius, which was transferred to the Santa Giulia Museum in the 1990s.

Chapel of the Crucifix

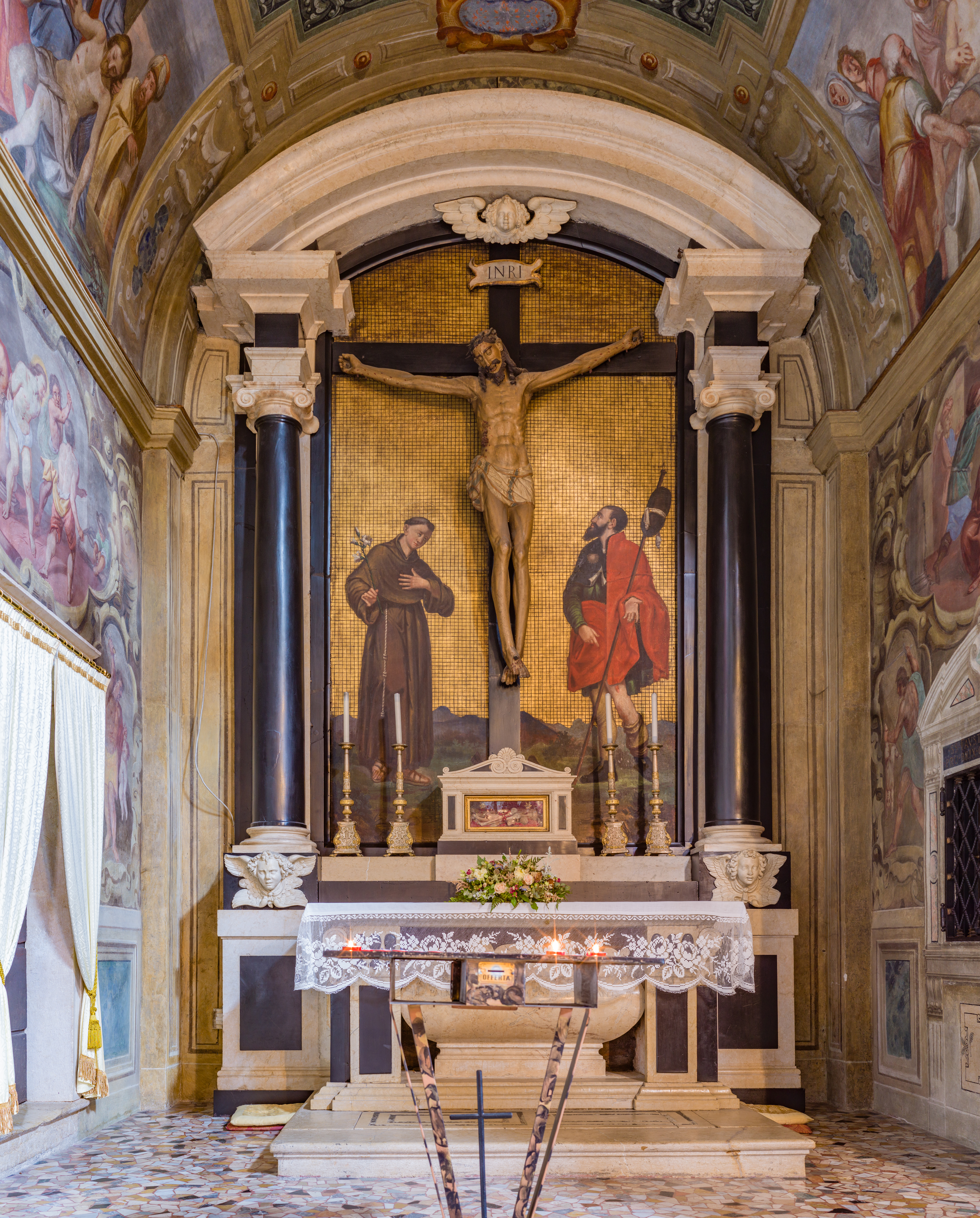
The Chapel of the Crucifix.

The chapel at the head of the left aisle, dedicated to the crucifixion of Jesus, takes on the features visible today during the seventeenth-century renovations, remaining substantially unchanged since then. The fairly simple and restrained altar houses a seventeenth-century wooden crucifix of rather mediocre design. A nineteenth-century addition, on the other hand, is the mosaic background of golden tiles with the figures of St. Roch and St. Anthony of Padua. The altar below bears as its antependium a funerary urn containing relics of unidentified martyrs from the various altars that occupied the ancient church. Above the mensa, on the other hand, is the urn with the remains of St. Honorius, moved there in 1949 from the opposite chapel that was being converted into a baptistery. Finally, two more relics are kept in the chapel, taken from the remains of the patron saints Faustinus and Jovita and housed in the urn of the Patron Saints, an elaborate reliquary specially made in 1925 and placed in a recessed compartment in the right wall of the chapel. Every year, on February 15, the feast of the two saints, the reliquary is taken out and placed in the center of the nave.

The walls of the chapel are decorated with numerous fresco panels with narrative scenes related to the life of Jesus. The authors would again be Tommaso Sandrino for the faux architectural frames and Antonio Gandino and Camillo Rama for the scenes depicted. All the paintings, however, were restored and completed by Vittorio Trainini and his son Giuseppe between 1923 and 1930. The altar of the chapel is at the center of an unusual popular tradition: since the skull of Saint Honorius has a vertical fracture, traditionally his devotion is said to bring relief to headaches. It is therefore customary, especially during the feast days of the patron saints, for the faithful to pray at the altar by sticking their heads into one of the two niches on the sides of the altar, apparently always used for this purpose.

Altar of Saint Benedict

The apparatus was built in 1649 for the purpose of being able to transfer to it the relic of the saint's arm, brought to Brescia centuries earlier from the abbey of Montecassino. The relic would never be moved to the altar due to the death the following year of Abbot Orazio Barbisoni, the main promoter of the initiative. The altar, therefore, is designated to house relics of other Benedictine saints, including the jawbone of St. Placidus. The altar is the work of sculptor Giovanni Carra, son of Giovanni Antonio Carra. The color scheme of the altar is entirely set on an alternation of black and white marble, which adds to its uniqueness.

In the large central panel is placed perhaps the most singular altarpiece in the city's artistic history: a statue of St. Benedict kneeling and praying, with his pastoral staff, mitre at his feet and a raven offering the saint a bread held in its beak. On the backdrop of the niche is a fresco depicting a flight of angels and the abbey of Montecassino, the work of Sante Cattaneo, who would, however, have merely repainted an identical theme already present.

Chapel of the Blessed Sacrament

Its construction, which was the responsibility of the School of the Blessed Sacrament formerly active in the church, followed a very long and eventful path, lasting almost eighty years, from the beginning to the last years of the seventeenth century. This was mainly due to the four, large columns adorning it, which, according to the School's wishes, should have been monolithic blocks. All goals were eventually achieved and the altar could finally be inaugurated in 1696. Giuseppe Cantone, the architect of the church facade, also participated in the construction of the altar. The apparatus is, on the whole, very simple, but the preciousness is found in the very fine multicolored marble inlays of the tabernacle and antependium, where numerous gems are also used. The work of Giovanni Carra and his brother Carlo, on the other hand, are the two statuettes depicting the patron saints on the side of the antependium.

The chapel's altarpiece was originally the Lamentation over the Dead Christ executed between 1520 and 1530 by Romanino, which was requisitioned in 1797 and finally destroyed in 1945. In its place, a replacement canvas was commissioned in 1808 from Sante Cattaneo, who executed the Deposition of Christ that is still present and can be placed among his best works. Also hanging on the wall in the chapel was the standard of the Blessed Sacrament, also by Romanino, since 1965 displayed elsewhere. Hanging on the walls of the chapel are two octagonal canvases: on the right, the Meeting of Abraham with Melchizedek attributed to Pietro Avogadro and, on the left, the Gathering of the Manna by an anonymous seventeenth-century artist.

Altar of Santa Maria in Silva

The dedication to Santa Maria in Silva rather than to Our Lady alone is in homage to the dedication the church had in its origins. The altar was built during the first half of the eighteenth century to replace the previous wooden one and completed in 1726. It consists of a large scenic apparatus, extremely rich in details and decorative motifs, a typical feature of 18th-century Baroque. The material used is predominantly red breccia with white marble framing, which, together with the gilding and numerous inlays, provides an absolutely remarkable chromatic result. The most important sculptural inserts of the altar can be assigned to the hand of Antonio Calegari, while the rest can be attributed to his workshop.

Of very fine workmanship and conception is the statue of the Madonna and Child with St. John the Baptist around which the entire apparatus revolves, the work of Paolo Amatore, an artist who lived in the early seventeenth century with a fairly vague biography. The statue, therefore, was not made together with the altar, but preceded it, kept because it was linked to a strong veneration. The work, made of gilded and painted carved wood, depicts Our Lady holding the Child, while at her feet is placed the devil, whom Our Lady is trampling with absolute indifference. On the side is Saint John the Baptist as a child, also with one foot on the devil. This St. John, however, would be a 19th-century addition. The antependium of the mensa is decorated with two marble statuettes depicting the prophets Isaiah and Hosea: the two sculptures were stolen in 1975 and were therefore replaced by copies. Later, the originals were recovered, but not relocated: the statuettes visible on the altar are still the two copies.

=== Paintings, sculptures and other works ===
==== The ark of Saints Faustinus and Jovita ====
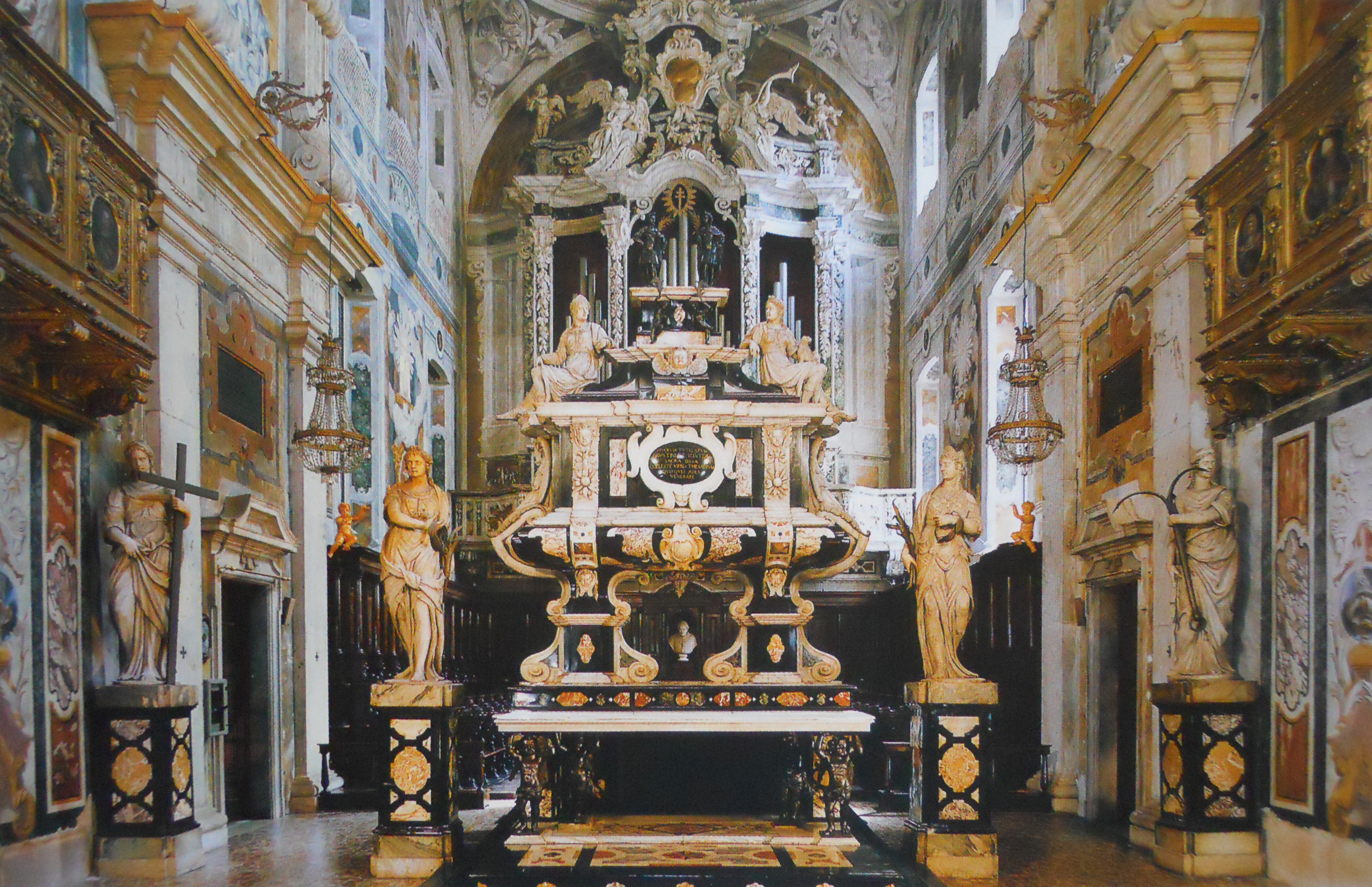
The sepulchral ark of the patron saints in a frontal view.

The large tomb, which serves as the church's high altar, is the work of sculptor Giovanni Antonio Carra, who made it between 1617 and 1622 to replace the previous one. To this day, the ark contains the remains of Saints Faustinus and Jovita, the titular saints of the church and patrons of the city. The decorative style of the tomb is fully Baroque. The ark, given its function as the custody of the relics of the two patron saints of Brescia, additionally possesses a strong religious significance. It is mainly of Carrara marble variously inlaid with black marble and other multicolored stones. On the extreme top it bears bronze figures of the patron saints surmounted by a double cross, modeled after the relic of the Holy Cross preserved in the treasure of the Holy Crosses in the Old Cathedral. On the lid sit two allegorical female figures in Carrara marble, unidentified by connotative attributes, but supposedly depicting Fortitude and Faith, according to the records.

In the center of the ark, on both front and back, are two black marble roundels surrounded by a frieze, on which stand, in gold lettering, the celebratory inscriptions of the two martyred saints. Then serving as wings to the ark are four statues originally conceived as supports for the canopy that crowned the composition, which was destroyed in the fire of 1743. The two outermost ones depict Faith on the left and Hope on the right, while the two inner ones, bearing only a laurel wreath and a palm leaf, can be identified as Victories, by reason of the palms and crowns they hold, which would be a more suitable iconography to exalt the glory of martyrdom.

==== Rooster of Ramperto ====
The rooster of Ramperto is a weathercock made in the year 820 or 830 to adorn the top of the church bell tower on commission from Bishop Ramperto, hence the name, probably as a gift to the religious community that was already forming around the cult of the patron saints and would formalize by founding the monastery some 20 years later. The rooster was removed from its post only in 1891, after more than a thousand years, to be restored and preserved in the city's museum, the Museo di Santa Giulia, where it still stands.

The work has traversed the centuries almost unscathed: only the tail feathers, originally much thicker, are now few and thinned out, due to damage caused by French soldiers who, in the second half of the 19th century, in the monastery by then reduced to barracks, amused themselves by shooting at the rooster at the top of the bell tower. This led to the loss of the dedicatory inscription Ramperto had placed right on the feathers, an inscription that had already been copied several times from the fifteenth century onward. Dating back to the early ninth century, the "rooster of Ramperto" can be considered the oldest existing weathercock, with an age of nearly 1,200 years.

==== The standard of Romanino ====
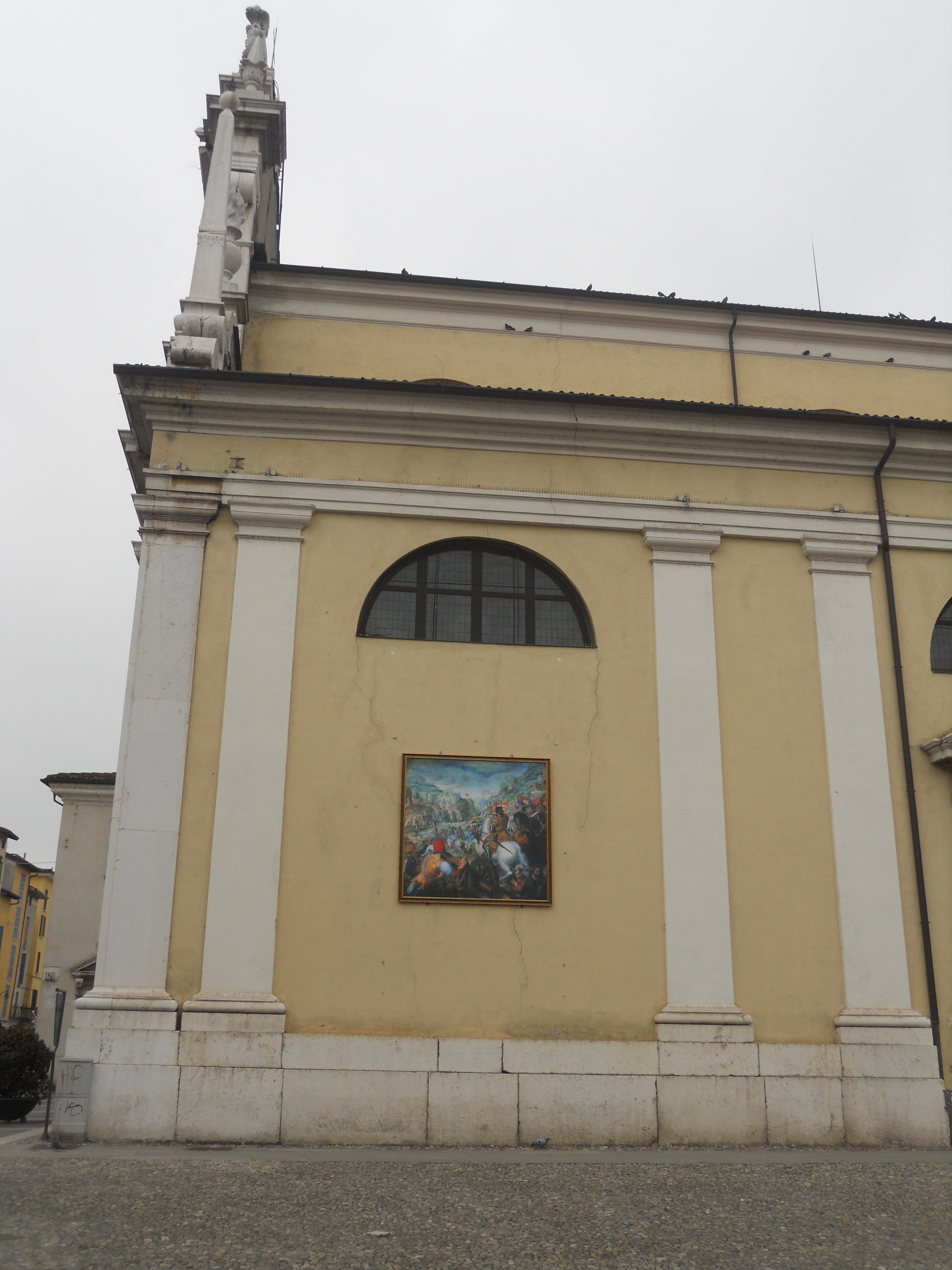
The reproduction of Grazio Cossali's painting hung on the side of the church during the patronal festival. Until the first half of the 20th century, the original canvas was displayed.

A work of exquisite artistic quality is the processional standard of the Blessed Sacrament, made by Romanino between 1535 and 1540 for members of the School of the Blessed Sacrament active in the church, where it had the altar of the same name, the second on the left. The canvas is painted on both sides: on one depicts the scene of the Resurrection, on the other the Mass of St. Apollonius. The standard was hoisted on a pole and carried annually in procession during the feast of Corpus Christi. After being kept for centuries in the Blessed Sacrament chapel, since 1965, on the completion of a thorough restoration, it has been hanging by means of supports between two columns in the left aisle of the church, so that both sides are visible. In the chapel, it was simply hanging on the wall, which would always prevent the view of one of the sides.

==== Grazio Cossali's canvas ====
On the counterfacade wall of the right aisle hangs the Apparition of Saints Faustinus and Jovita during the siege of Brescia by Nicolò Piccinino, a canvas by Grazio Cossali dated 1603 that takes up the theme of the miracle that took place in 1438 on the Roverotto terraces, the same one reproposed by Giandomenico Tiepolo a century and a half later in the left fresco of the presbytery. Cossali's scene, however, is usually the better known of the two since it was traditionally used to symbolize and recall the event.

The painting's notable fame is mainly due to the fact that, until the first half of the twentieth century, it was customary to hang it on the southern exterior side of the church on February 15, on the feast of the two patron saints. Even today the tradition is still maintained, but the canvas on display is only a copy. At least until the eighteenth century, the painting found a permanent display on the outer wall of the Discipline, which was demolished in 1927, as all the old city guides point out: it was to be transported inside the church after the suppression of the Discipline in 1797.

Cossali's work stands at a somewhat lower rung compared to his previous works, where, what is lost in the strong disproportions and the somewhat mediocre overall effect is recovered in the careful execution technique and in the excellent rendering of the battle scene, with trumpets, gunners, charging horsemen, embankments and powder smoke.

==== The 15th-century crucifix ====
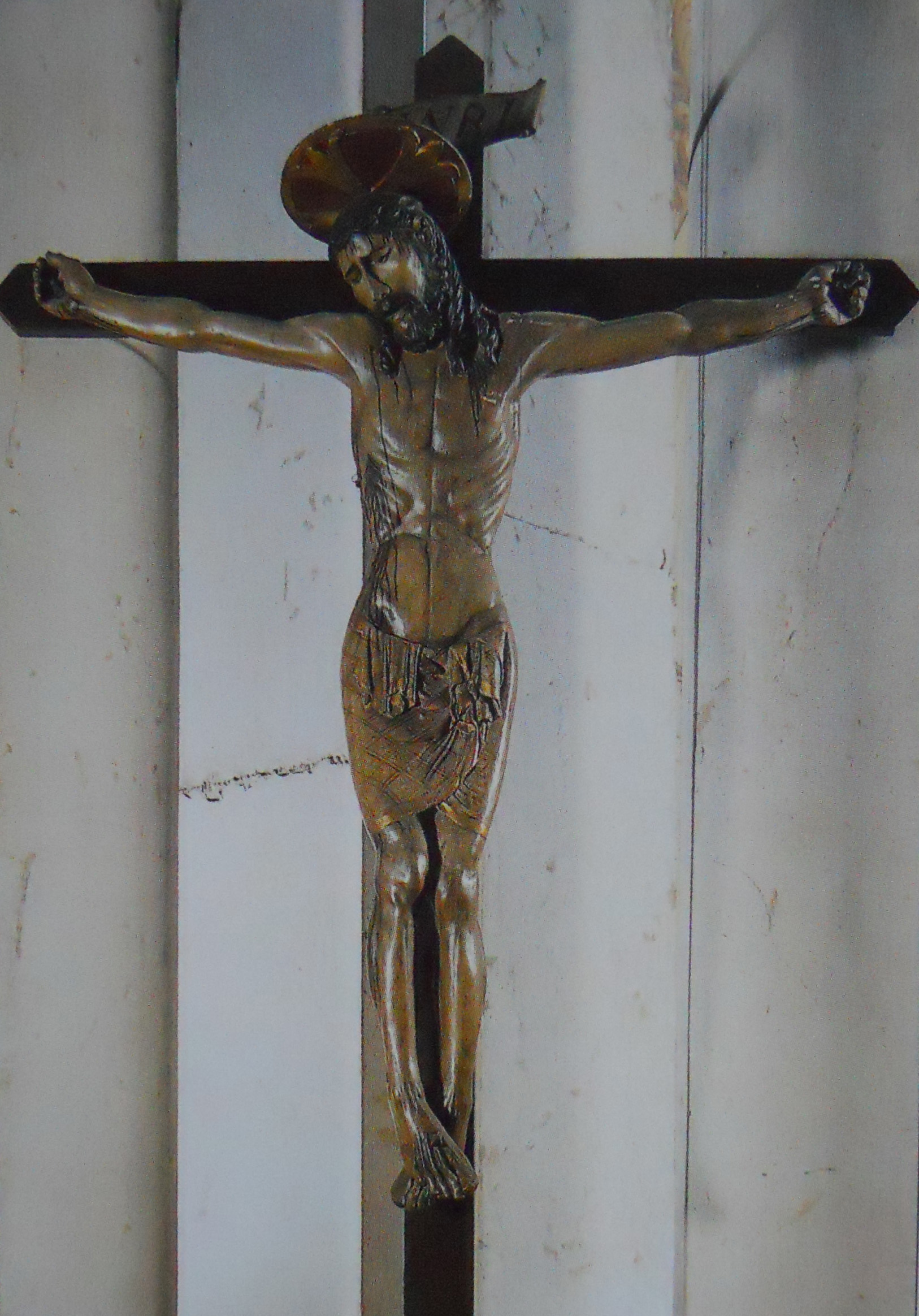
The 15th-century crucifix

Positioned to the right of the entrance to the chancel, it is the work of an unknown master carver of the late 15th century. The workmanship of the wooden artifact denotes great technical mastery and capacity for sentimental rendering: the limbs of Jesus are firm and placid, and a strong symmetry prevails on the sculpture, clearly evident in the identical regularity of the two arms spread apart.

The legs hang parallel and overlap only at the feet. The torso displays prominent ribs above a contracted abdomen, while the loincloth remains taut and static, reinforcing the sculpture's overall symmetry and calm posture.

==== The pipe organ ====
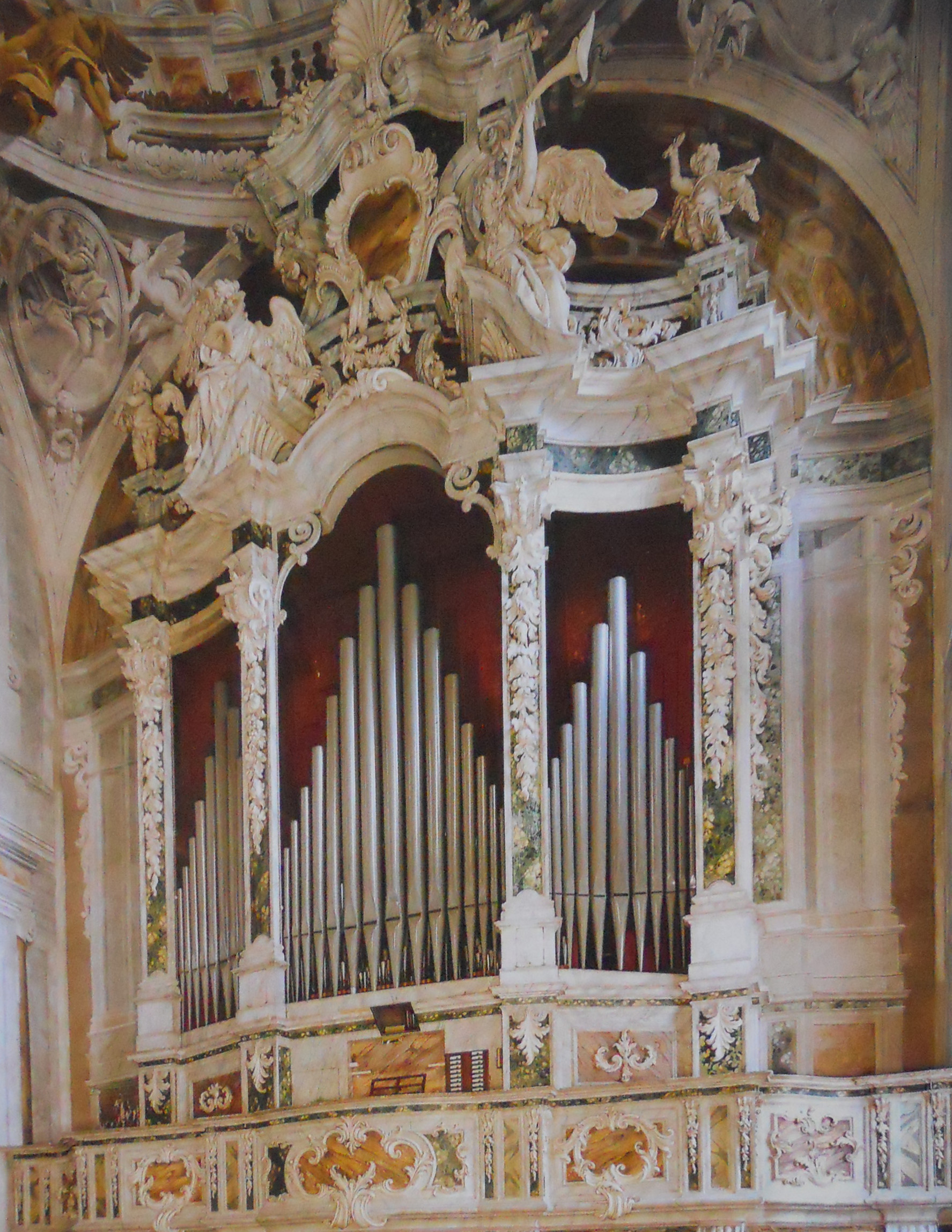
The pipe organ

On the choir loft behind the high altar is the Serassi pipe organ opus 567, built in 1843 in place of an 18th-century instrument whose case it retained. The instrument was restored by the same builders in 1860, and during the 19th and 20th centuries it underwent a series of interventions and modifications. In 1986, the organ was restored by the Pedrini organ company, which restored it to its original characteristics.

The case, painstakingly painted to simulate marble, is monumental in character. Despite its apparent secondary function of framing the organ pipes, the wooden apparatus plays an important role in completing the many elements that contribute to the beauty and harmony of the chancel. The fabrication of the large altarpiece can be ascribed to Giovanni Battista Carboni, including the four crowning statues, all very close to the accuracy and plasticity of Antonio Calegari's works.

The instrument has a fully mechanical transmission and features a window console that has a single 66-note keyboard with a short first octave and concave pedalboard of 27 notes.

==== Minor works ====
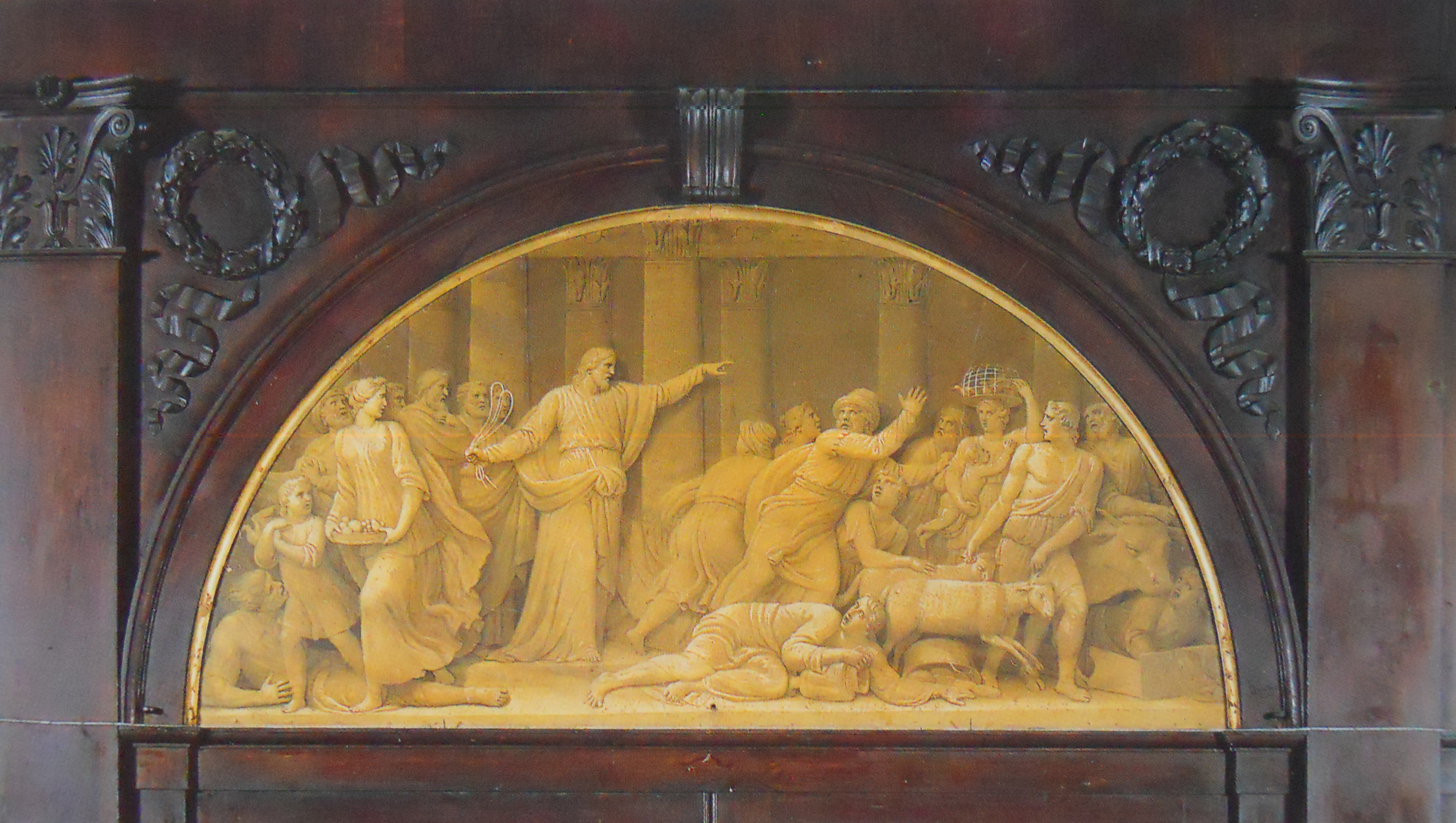
Jesus drives the merchants out of the Temple by Giuseppe Teosa

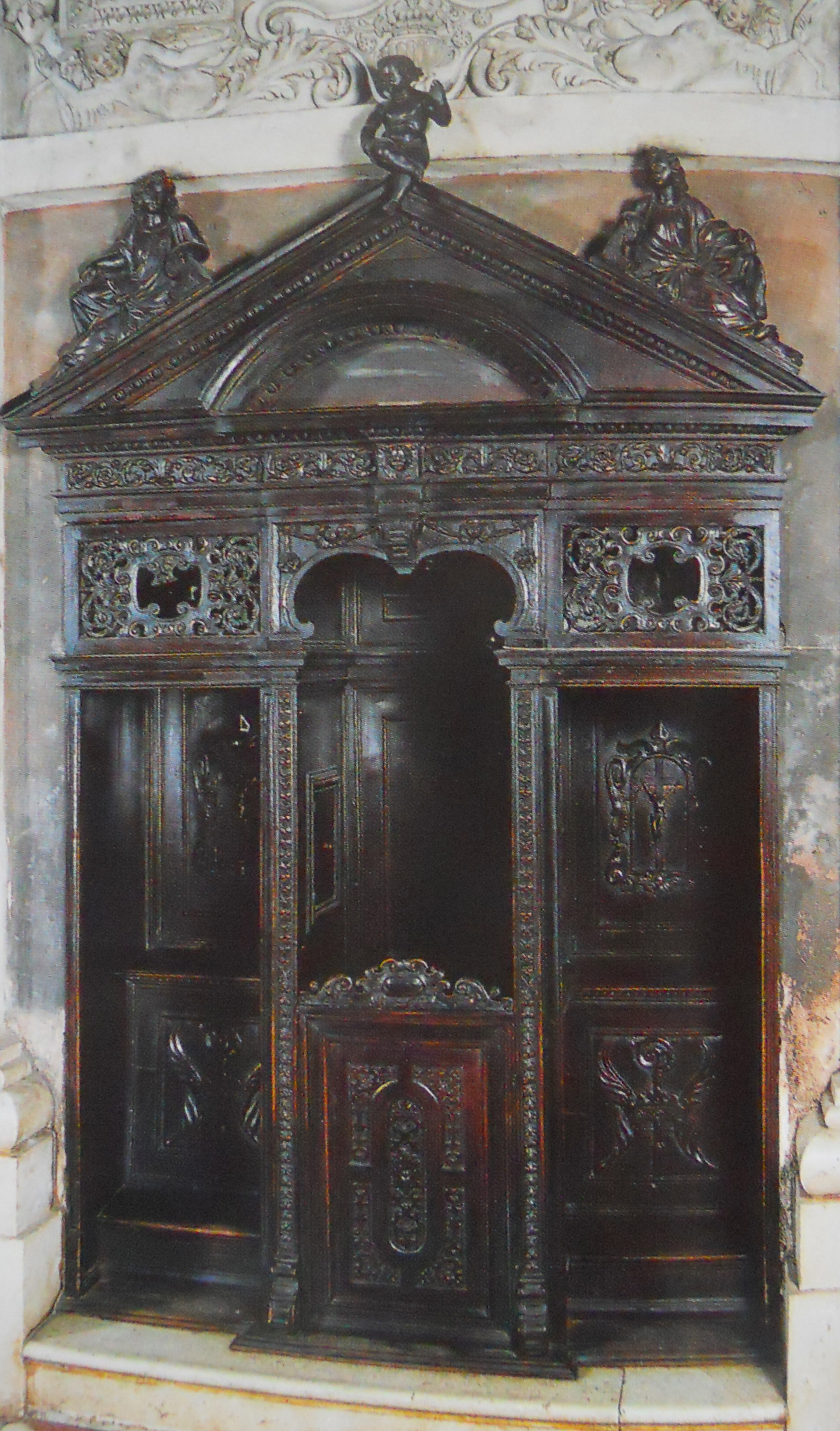
A confessional

- Giuseppe Teosa's lunette: the wooden compass of the side entrance, fabricated in 1831, is embellished with a painting by Giuseppe Teosa, a yellow monochrome lunette depicting the episode of Jesus driving the merchants out of the Temple. Teosa builds up each figure in detail, generating a dense series well characterized by neoclassical lines, even with types directly extracted from Roman art, as in the case of the sheep seller in the foreground on the far right. However, there is no shortage of sixteenth-century quotations, readable in the agitated postures of the fleeing merchants.
- The paintings above the confessionals: in the side aisles, within elaborate stucco frames above the confessionals, hang four paintings depicting saints and holy men and women in penitential attitudes. On the right wall are St. Peter by Gian Giacomo Barbelli and St. Jerome by Andrea Terzi, while on the left are placed St. Mary Magdalene again by Barbelli and St. Mary of Egypt by Bernardino Gandino. The four canvases, all executed in the early seventeenth century, are evidently part of a common decorative project, commissioned to embellish the wall spaces above the confessionals.
- The counterfacade canvas: above the main entrance, on the counterfacade wall, hangs a large canvas by Giovanni Carobio depicting St. John of Matha paying ransom for the liberation of slaves. This is not the painting's original location, as ancient guidebooks attest that it was on the counterfacade wall of the left aisle, occupied since the early 19th century by Marco Richiedei's Incredulity of St. Thomas. The first source to indicate it in its current position is Francesco Maccarinelli, who saw it in 1747. The attribution of the painting has also been reconsidered several times over the centuries: the assignment to the hand of Giovanni Carobio, also accepted by today's critics, is due to Giovanni Battista Carboni, who mentions it in 1760. The same goes for the artistic judgment: Carlo Marenzi, in 1825, did not hesitate to call it a "painter of no merit," while Antonio Morassi, in 1939, expressed keen appreciation for the work. The painting, in any case, ranks among the author's earliest known works and, consequently, is very important for reconstructing his artistic "path". Contemporary critics, moreover, are more inclined to reevaluate both the artistic quality of the canvas and the validity of the painter.
- Marco Richiedei's painting: on the counter-facade wall of the left aisle is located Marco Richiedei's Incredulity of St. Thomas. The canvas was originally the altarpiece for the high altar of the church of St. Thomas, in Via Pulusella, where it has always been described by the ancient guides of Brescia, dwelling rather on the identity of the author, which is quite vague, rather than on the painting. When the oratory was decommissioned in 1836, the canvas was placed where it still stands today. Two other canvases from the same church are preserved, one in the adjacent church of St. James, and the other, the Communion of the Apostles by Giuseppe Amatore, in the Diocesan Museum of Brescia.
- The choir lofts: these are placed on the side walls of the chancel, under the two frescoes by Giandomenico Tiepolo. The two artifacts are made of gilded and richly carved wood, with a parapet decorated with atlas lesenes framing numerous canvases, seven per chancel. In the intrados of both is engraved the date 1735, while the paintings are assignable to the seventeenth century and, in particular, to Antonio Gandino, according to the proposal put forward by Antonio Morassi and also accepted by today's critics. The choir lofts and canvases, therefore, were made at two different times and in any case before the fire of 1743, which did not damage them. All the various busts of saints and bishops depicted there are characterized by impeccable pictorial execution, great spiritual concentration and heated devotion fixed in their typifying gestures and attitudes. The two central panes are also characterized by the same executional attention and present as background perspective landscapes of considerable breadth, very bright, with elegant architectural inserts around them.
- Memorial monument to Giovanni Battista Lurani Cernuschi: the sculpture is located in the intercolumn closest to the chancel of the right colonnade. The provost ruled the parish from 1820 for a full sixty-five years, until 1884, with much zeal and profusion of his patrimony: he obtained for the church the relic of the Holy Cross requisitioned from the suppressed monastery of Santa Giulia and had a new altar built dedicated to it, subsidized the construction of a pulpit (removed during the twentieth century), and purchased, later donating them to the church, numerous liturgical furnishings and vestments. The monument, inaugurated in 1889, is the work of architect Antonio Tagliaferri, while the bust at the top was fabricated by sculptor Francesco Giacomo Pezzoli. The base houses two large black marble slabs bearing a long dedicatory and celebratory inscription, in Italian on the front side, toward the nave, and in Latin on the back.
- Confessionals: the church's four original confessionals, made in the early 17th century, are recessed in the side walls, two in each aisle, in the wall sections between the chapels. They are made of carved walnut wood, small in size and shallow in depth. Being placed under the four paintings already mentioned by the painters Barbello, Gandino and Terzi, they appear as a reference point for the latter in the guides of the time, starting with Bernardino Faino, who sees them in 1630. The four artifacts appear mainly as architectural apparatuses, with the three compartments to house the confessors, lesenes, entablature, and triangular pediment, all complemented by various decorations and two finely carved gratings, placed above the side compartments to equalize the height with the central, higher compartment. Two allegorical figures are placed on the slopes of the pediment, while a small angel sits on the apex.
- The stoups: at the beginning of the nave, next to the main entrance, are positioned two stoups made of red Verona marble with yellow and pink hues, fabricated during the reconstruction of the church and thus dating from the early 17th century. The base rests on four lion's paws, the column follows an amphora profile, and the basin is flat and very expanded, with a very balanced overall effect.

At the end of the twentieth century, with the recovery of the adjoining church of St. James, formerly the baptistery, as a multipurpose hall for parish activities, a number of works that were part of the church's artistic heritage, otherwise not exhibited elsewhere, found their permanent place in it. These are a Crucifixion by an anonymous painter from the 15th century, a Madonna and Child between Saints James the Greater and Anne by a Brescian painter from the second half of the 16th century, St. Louis Gonzaga adoring the Crucifix by Pietro Scalvini, from the church of St. George, and the last canvas from the church of St. Thomas, in addition to the already mentioned ones by Richiedei and Amatore, namely St. Philip Neri invites the children to venerate the Madonna by Liberale Cozza.

== The treasure ==
In the rooms attached to the church is preserved a remarkable treasure consisting of liturgical objects, reliquaries and vestments. Among the numerous pieces, special mention is made of the Cross of St. Faustinus, that is, the reliquary where the fragment of the True Cross acquired by the church in 1828 was contained. Other pieces include chalices, monstrances, services for incensation and ablution, candelabra, candlesticks, processional insignia, reliquaries, chasubles, and altar cloths, all made mainly between the seventeenth and nineteenth centuries. Prominent among them is the chalice of the Eucharistic Mystery, a fine 1823 work by Milanese goldsmith and sculptor Eugenio Brusa.

Also part of the treasury is the urn of the Patron Saints, a reliquary made in 1925 to hold the two femurs of the saints taken from the ark in 1923. The urn is kept directly in the church, in a side niche in the Chapel of the Crucifix.

== Other images ==
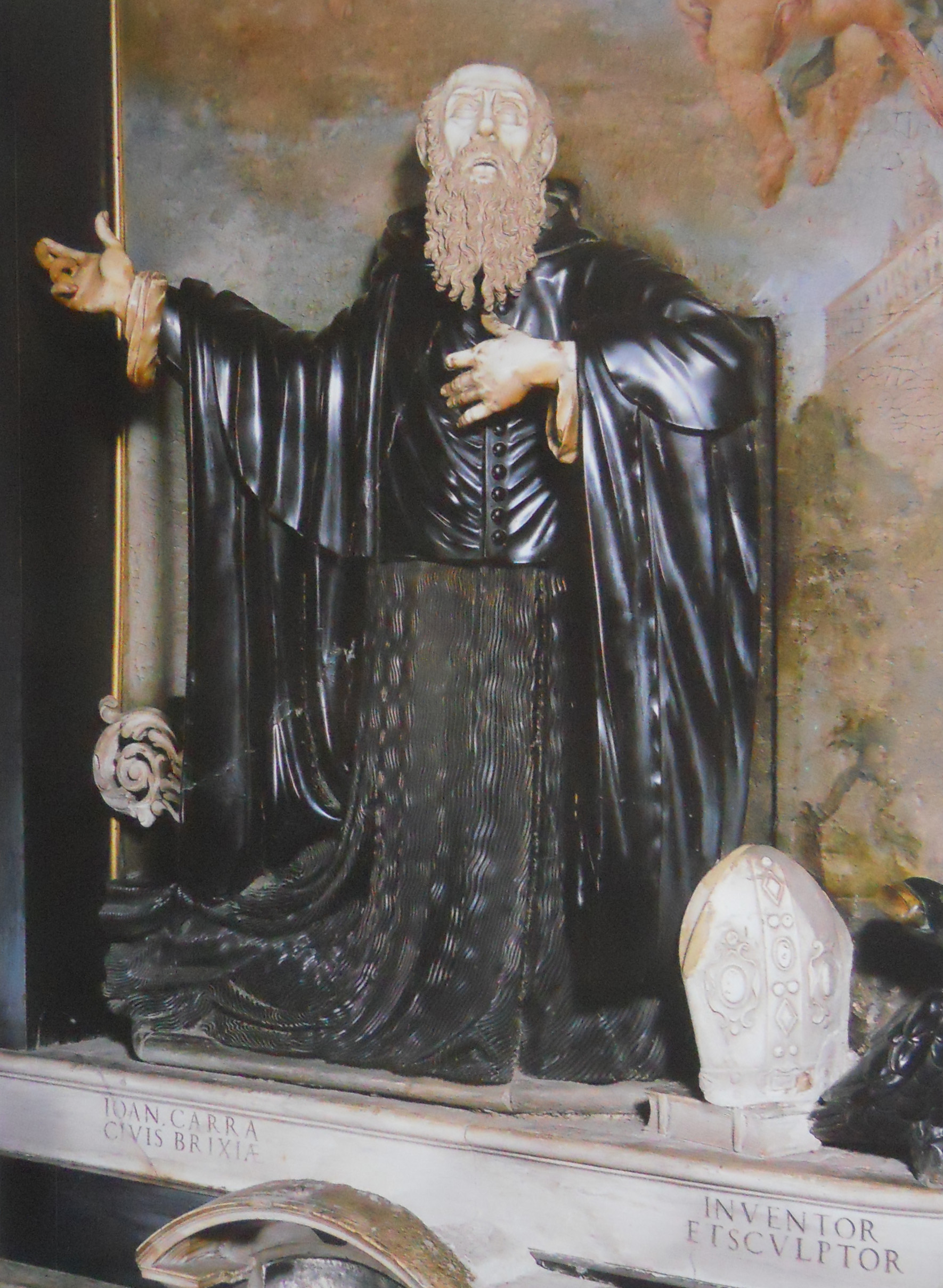
Giovanni Carra's statue of St. Benedict.

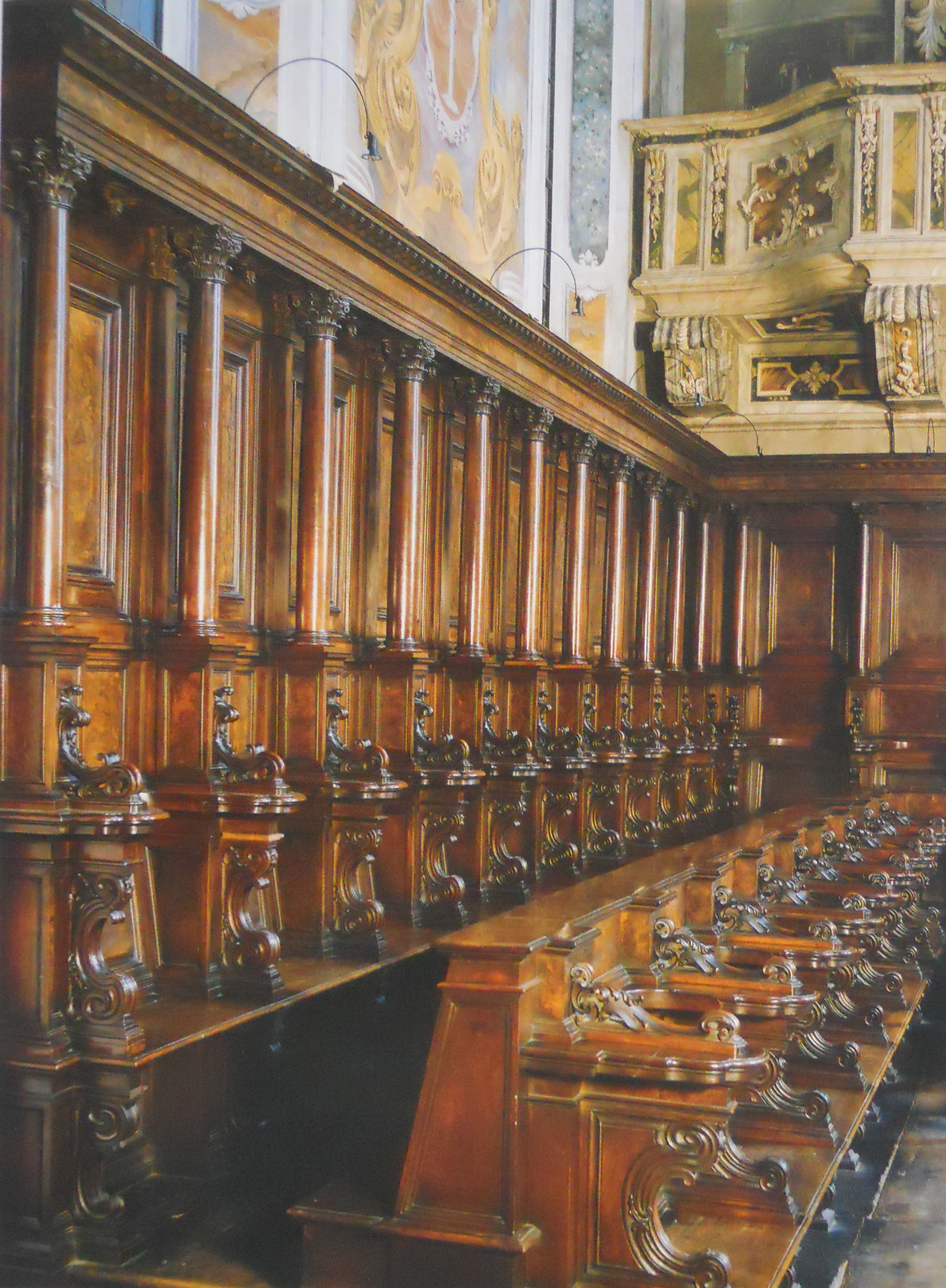
Giovanni Battista Carboni's choir stalls.

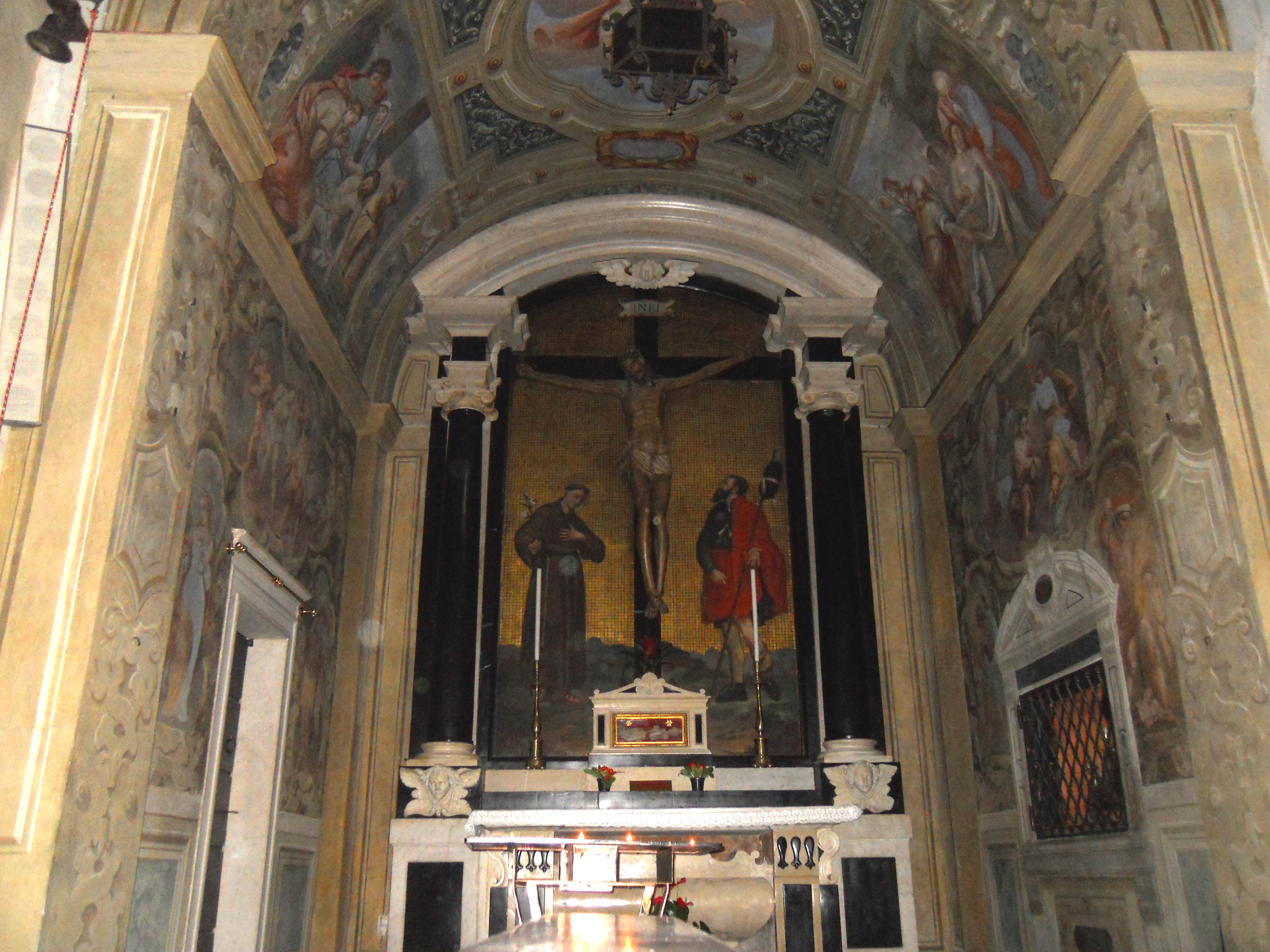
Chapel of the Crucifix.

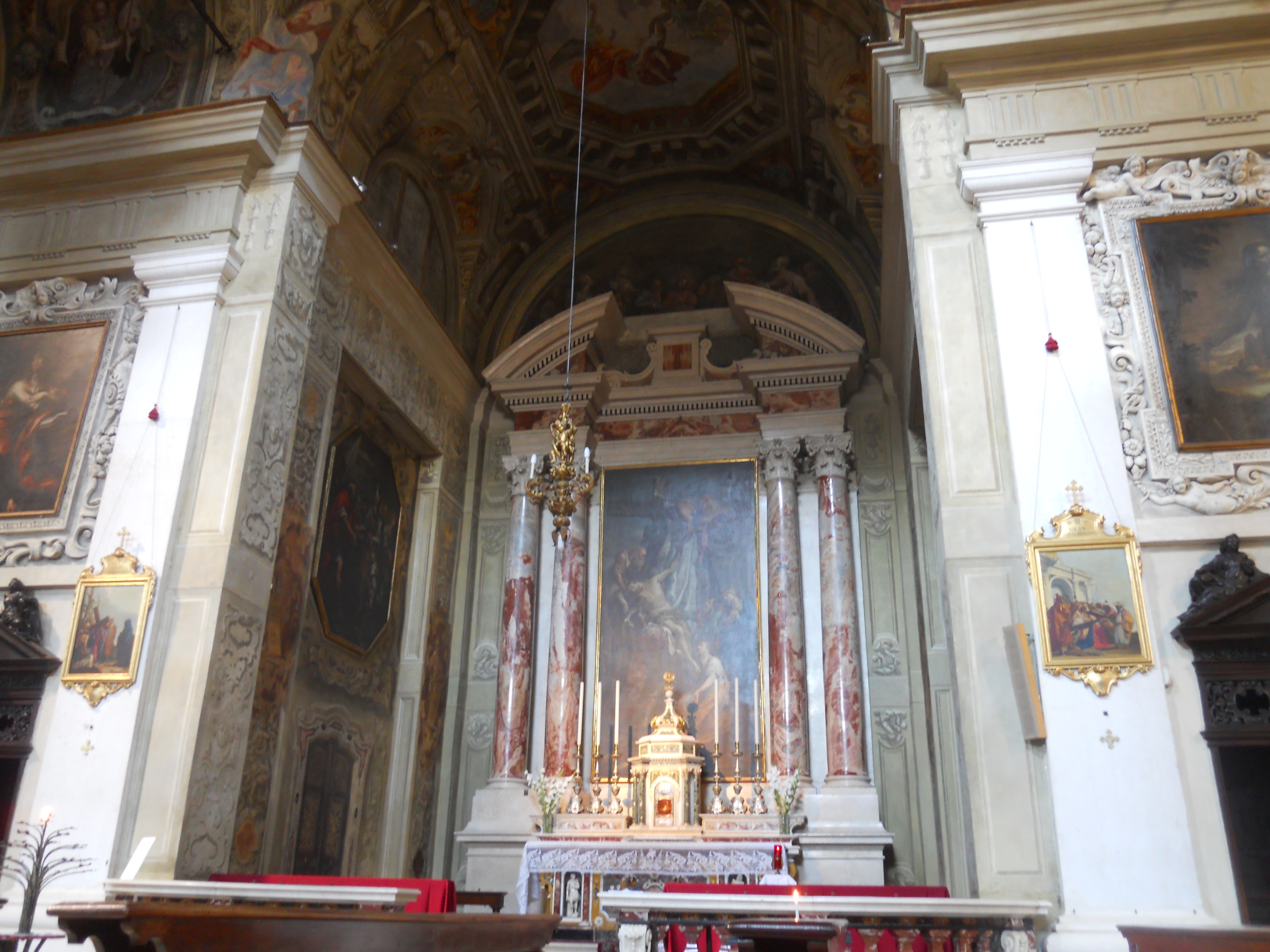
Chapel of the Blessed Sacrament.

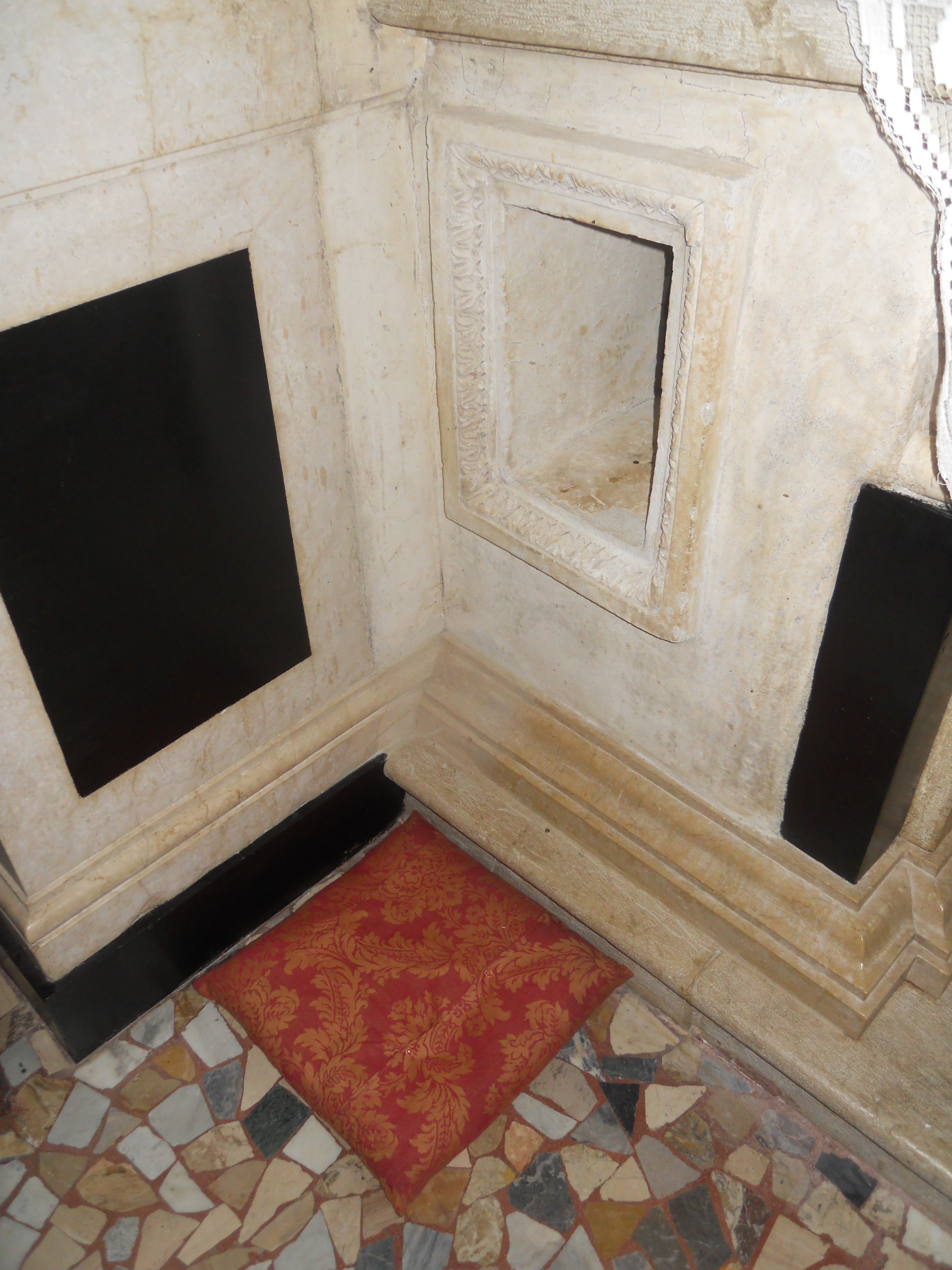
One of the side recesses of the altar of the Crucifix. Note the cushion set up on the floor for kneeling.

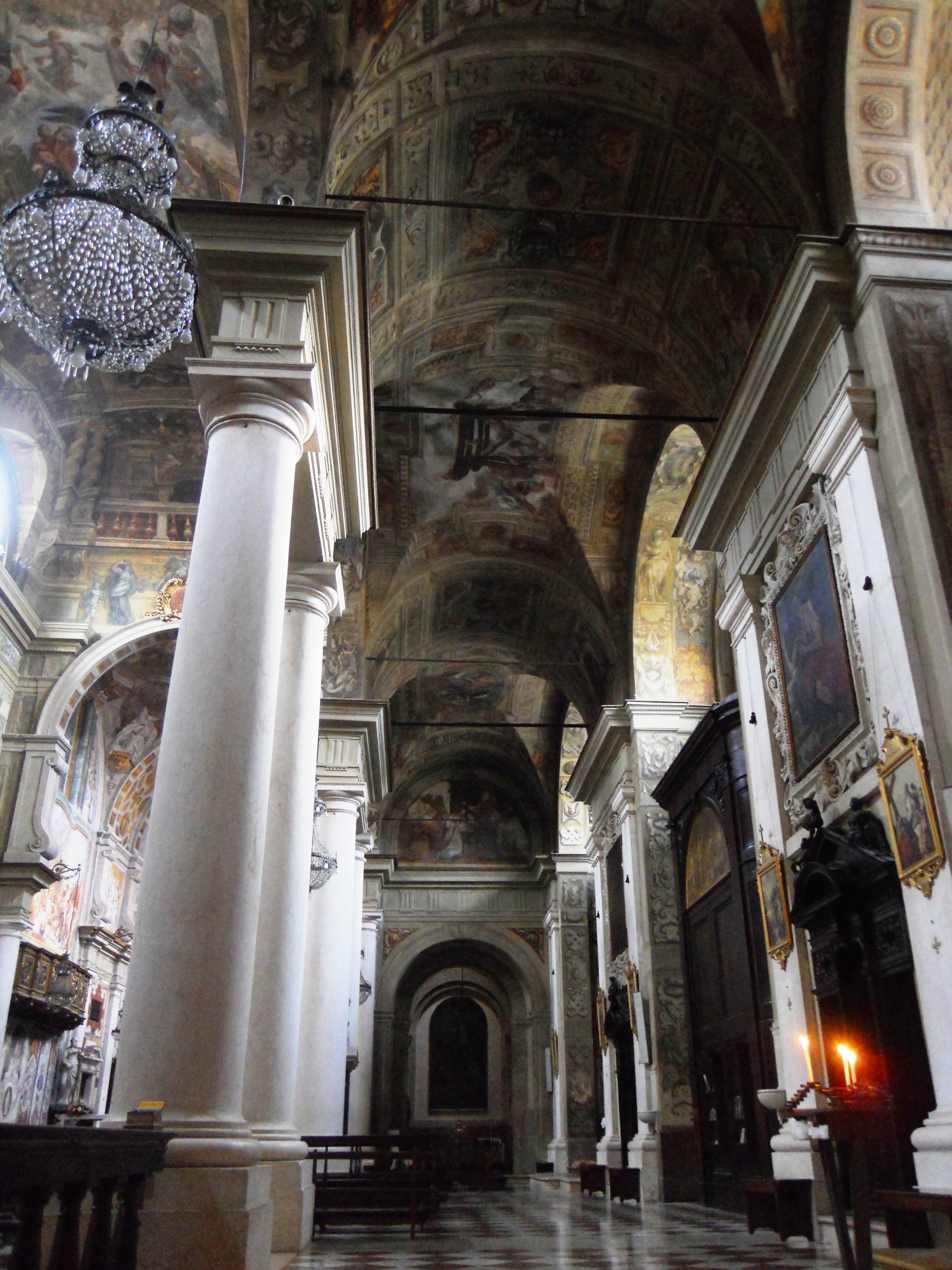
The right nave.

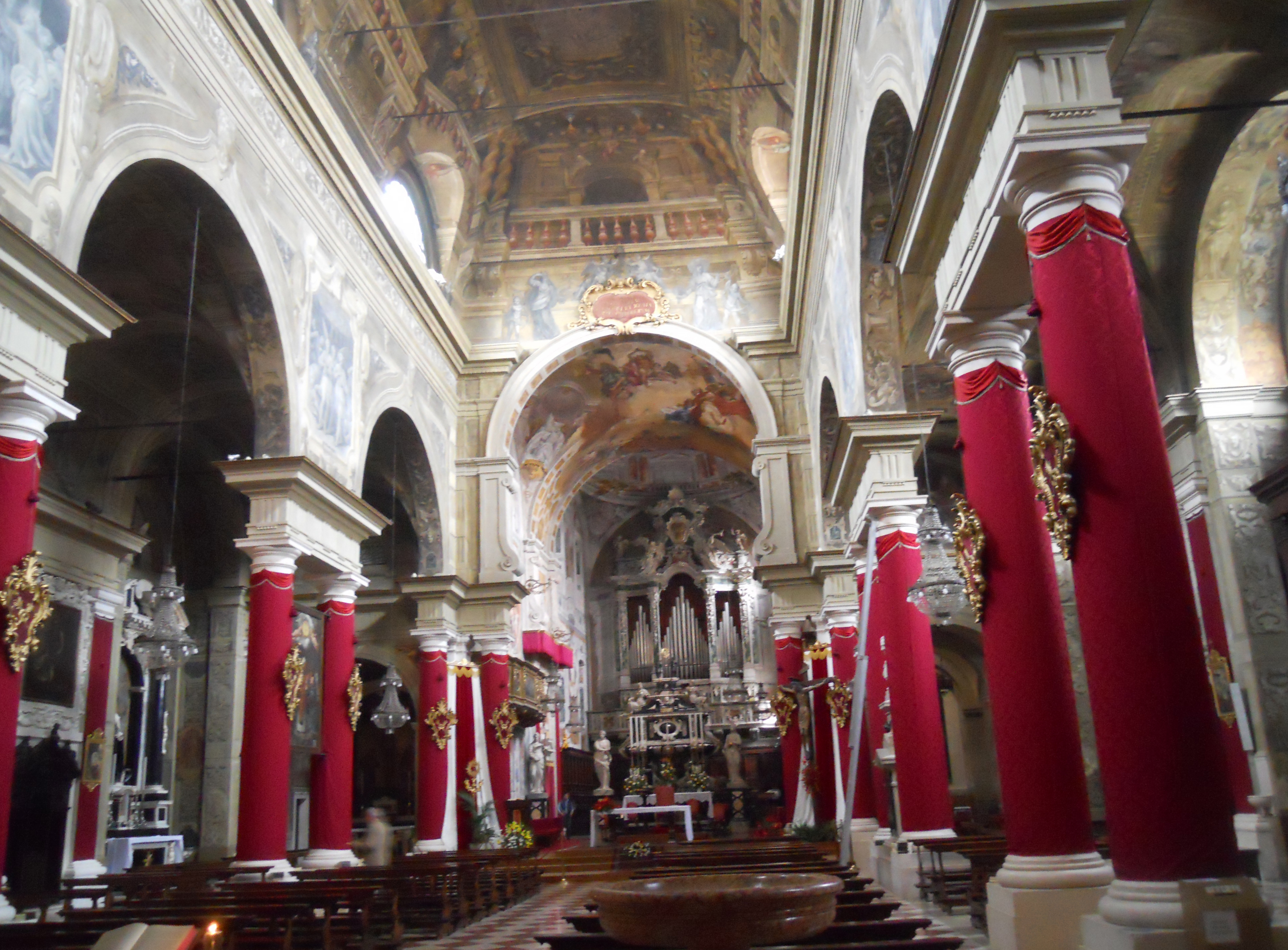
The interior of the church covered in red during the patronal feast.

== See also ==
- Faustinus and Jovita
- Old Cathedral, Brescia
- New Cathedral, Brescia

== Bibliography ==
=== Ancient sources ===
- Giulio Antonio Averoldi (1700). Le scelte pitture di Brescia additate al forestiere. Brescia.
- Brognoli, Paolo (1826). Nuova Guida di Brescia. Brescia.
- Bianchi (1630). Diari. Brescia.
- Giovanni Battista Carboni (1760). Le pitture e sculture di Brescia che sono esposte al pubblico con un'appendice di alcune private gallerie. Brescia.
- Faino, Bernardino (1630). Catalogo Delle Chiese riuerite in Brescia, et delle Pitture et Scolture memorabili, che si uedono in esse in questi tempi. Brescia.
- Faino, Bernardino (1670). Vita delli Santi fratelli Martiri Faustino et Giovita primi sacrati a Dio. Brescia.
- Maccarinelli, Francesco (1747). Le Glorie di Brescia raccolte dalle Pitture, Che nelle sue Chiese, Oratorii, Palazzi et altri luoghi publici sono esposte. Brescia.
- Marenzi, Carlo (1825). Il servitore di piazza della città di Bergamo per le belle arti. Bergamo.
- Nassino, Pandolfo (1512). Registro delle Cose di Brescia (Documenti relativi ai primi decenni del XVI secolo). Brescia.
- Rossi, Ottavio (1623). Relatione dell'aprimento dell'arca de' santissimi protomartiri, et protettori della Città di Brescia Faustino, et Giovita, scritta all'illustrissimo, et eccellentissimo Sig. Lionardo Mocenigo Procurator di San Marco, da Ottavio Rossi stampata d'ordine publico. Brescia.
- Rossi, Ottavio (1624). Historia de' gloriosissimi santi martiri Faustino et Giovita, scritta da Ottavio Rossi. Nella quale si discorre brevemente ancora de gli altri gloriosissimi santi Faustino et Giovita secondi martiri di questo nome, e d'altri santi di molte famiglie bresciane. Brescia.
- Giorgio Vasari (1568). Le vite de' più eccellenti Pittori, Scultori, e Architetti scritte da M. Giorgio Vasari pittore et architetto aretino, Di Nuovo dal Medesimo Riviste Et Ampliate Con i Ritratti loro Et con l'aggiunta delle Vite de' vivi, & de' morti Dall'anno 1550 insino al 1567. Firenze.

=== Modern sources ===
- Begni Redona, Pier Virgilio (1999). "Pitture e sculture in San Faustino". In A.A.V.V. (ed.). La chiesa e il monastero benedettino di San Faustino Maggiore in Brescia. Brescia: Editrice La Scuola.
- Guerrini, Paolo (1931). "Il Monastero di San Faustino Maggiore". Memorie Storiche della Diocesi di Brescia. Brescia.
- Mezzanotte, Gianni (1999). "San Faustino Maggiore. Il monastero e la Regola". In A.A.V.V. (ed.). La chiesa e il monastero benedettino di San Faustino Maggiore in Brescia. Brescia: Editrice La Scuola.
- Morassi, Antonio (1939). "Brescia". Catalogo delle cose d'arte e di antichità d'Italia. Roma.
- Pagiaro, Sergio (1985). Santuario Sant'Angela Merici. Bagnolo Mella: Litografica Bagnolese. [ISBN unspecified]
- Panteghini, Ivo (1999). "Il tesoro della chiesa di San Faustino". In A.A.V.V. (ed.). La chiesa e il monastero benedettino di San Faustino Maggiore in Brescia. Brescia: Editrice La Scuola.
- Prestini, Rossana (1999). "Regesto". In A.A.V.V. (ed.). La chiesa e il monastero benedettino di San Faustino Maggiore in Brescia. Brescia: Editrice La Scuola.
- Prestini, Rossana (1999). "Vicende faustiniane". In A.A.V.V. (ed.). La chiesa e il monastero benedettino di San Faustino Maggiore in Brescia. Brescia: Editrice La Scuola.
- Savio, Fedele (1929). "Parte II. Vol. I". Gli antichi vescovi d'Italia dalle origini al 1300 descritti per regioni. La Lombardia: Bergamo – Brescia - Como - Bergamo. Bergamo.
- Vezzoli, Giovanni (1964). "La scultura dei secoli XVII e XVIII". In Giovanni Treccani (ed.). Storia di Brescia. Brescia. pp. volume IV.
- Volta, Valentino (1986). "Cronologia: le fonti e i documenti". In A.A.V.V. (ed.). San Faustino a Brescia. Cronache edilizie e rilievi per il restauro. Brescia: Dipartimento di ingegneria civile dell'Università di Brescia.
- Volta, Valentino (1999). "Evoluzione edilizia del complesso di San Faustino". In A.A.V.V. (ed.). La chiesa e il monastero benedettino di San Faustino Maggiore in Brescia. Brescia: Editrice La Scuola.
