= Treasure of the Holy Crosses =

Group of relics kept in the old cathedral of Brescia, Italy

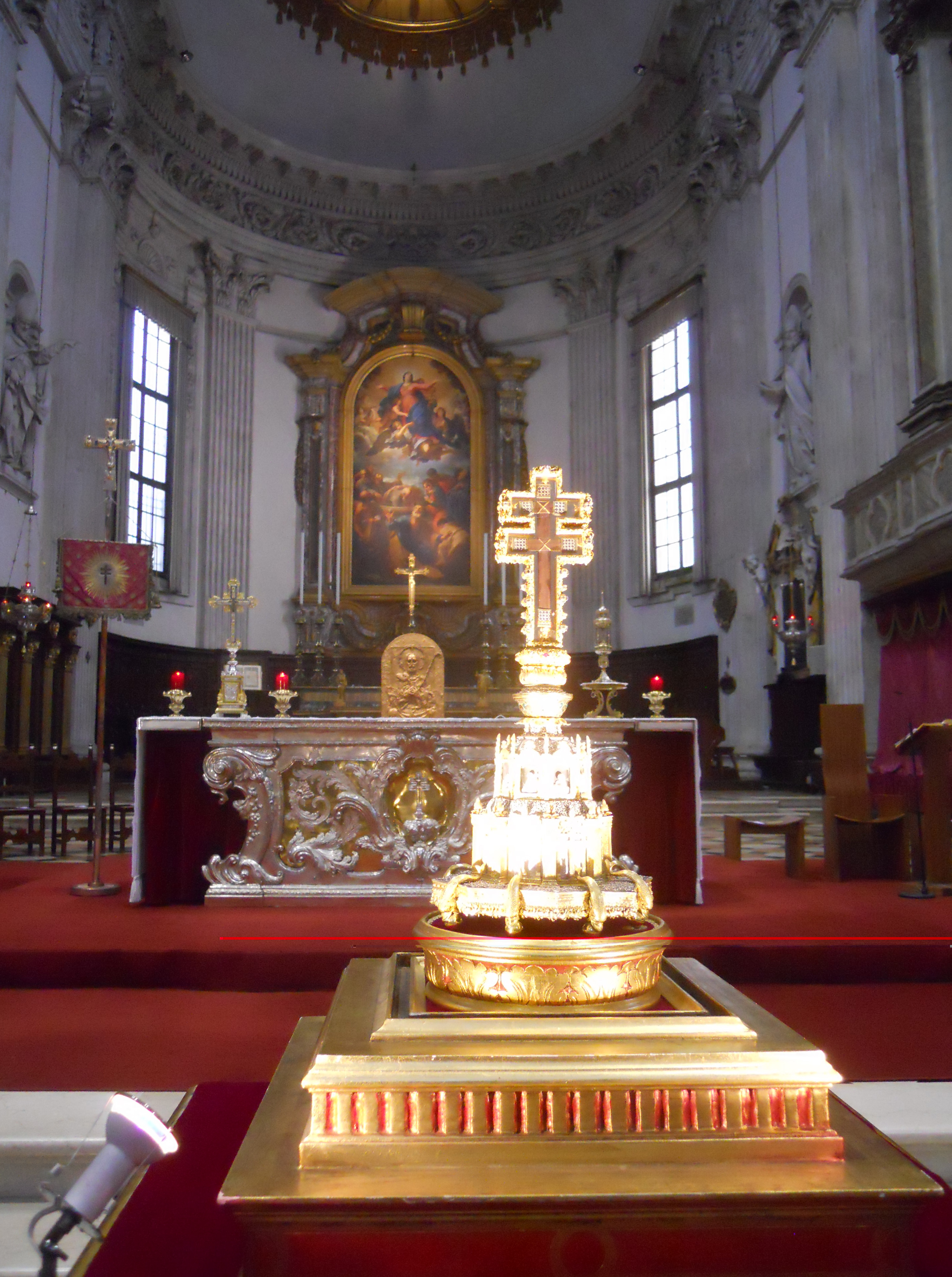
The reliquary of the Holy Cross displayed in Brescia's New Cathedral. Other pieces of the treasure are glimpsed in the background.

The Treasure of the Holy Crosses is a group of items of high historical, artistic and religious interest kept in the Old Cathedral of Brescia in the Chapel of the Holy Crosses in the north transept. The treasure, usually locked inside a safe except during brief exhibitions, consists of:

- the relic of the True Cross, known as the Illustrious Relic;
- the staurotheke, an 11th-century silver-plated wooden casket, the original case to the Illustrious Relic;
- the reliquary of the Holy Cross, made of silver and gold with enamels and gems, dating partly from 1487 and partly from 1532;
- the Cross of the Field, the 11th-12th century silver-plated wood and gemstone cross that was hoisted on the Brescian chariot during the battles of the Lombard League;
- a metal-clad wooden trunk, a work from the first half of the 15th century;
- the reliquary of the Holy Thorns, an early 16th-century work by the Delle Croci from the monastery of Santa Giulia;
- the reliquary of Bishop Zane's Cross, containing two more fragments of the True Cross, made in 1841 by goldsmith Antonio Pedrina.

The treasure, which has been kept in the cathedral for nearly a thousand years and expanded over the centuries, is cared for by the Company of the Custodians of the Holy Crosses, which is responsible for the maintenance of the pieces and, above all, their preservation during ordinary exhibitions, which take place on the last Friday of Lent and on the Feast of the Exaltation of the Holy Cross, September 14, and extraordinary ones, which are generally linked to important liturgical events.

== History ==
=== The origins of the treasure ===
The earliest documentary record of the treasure's existence is a provision in the Statutes of Brescia from around 1260 or 1251, by which the podestà made arrangements with the captain and the elders of the people on where to keep the treasure and to whom to entrust its keys. No earlier archival sources are known and, therefore, it is not possible to derive from the documents the origins of the treasure, particularly the history of the Illustrious Relic, which is its main focus.

==== The relic of the Holy Cross: legends and truths ====
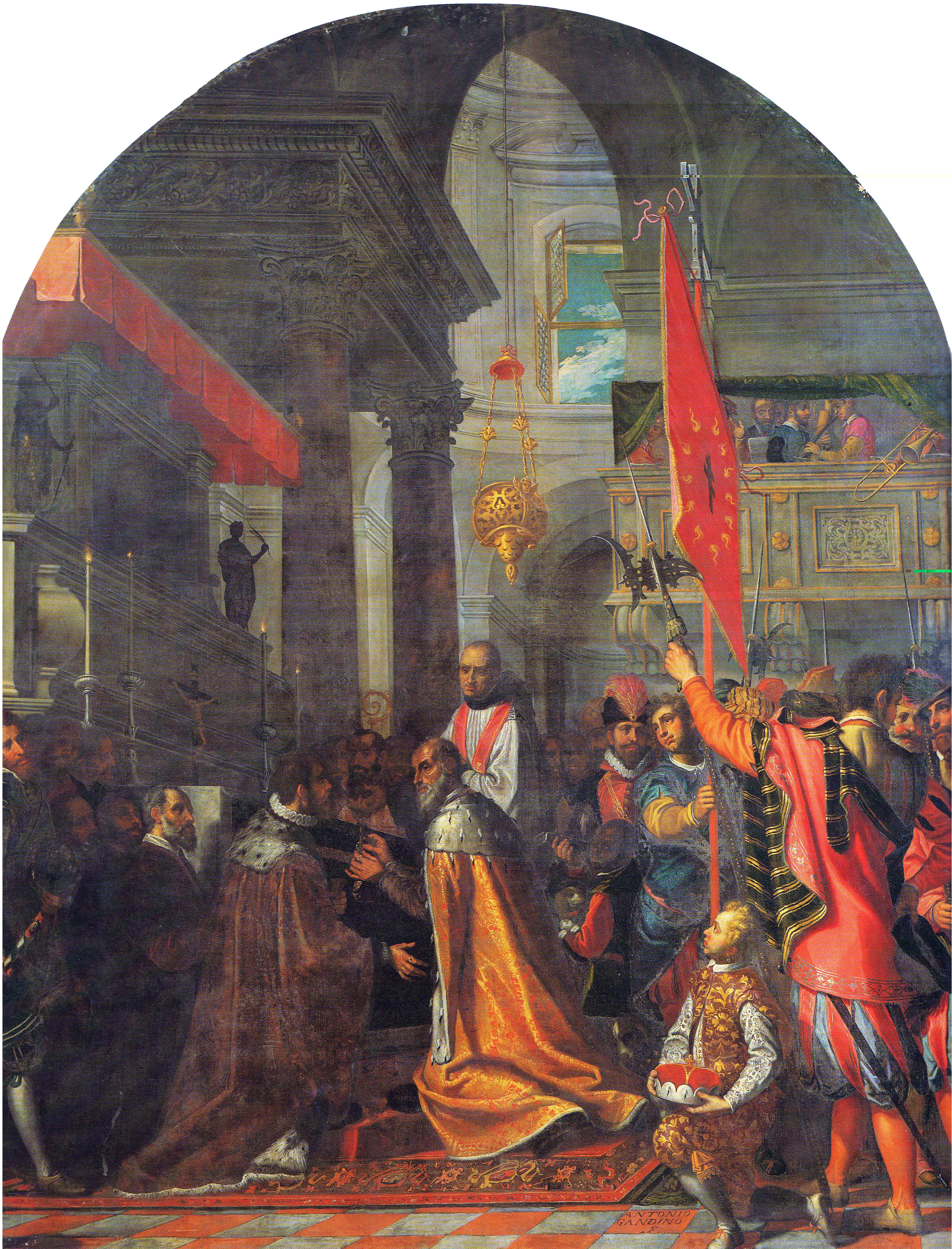
Antonio Gandino, Donation of Naimon of Bavaria, c. 1605. The painting reproduces the episode believed, according to legend, to be the origin of the treasure: the donation of the Illustrious Relic by Naimon of Bavaria.

The best-known legend explaining the origin of the treasure is the one first narrated by Jacopo Malvezzi in the first half of the fifteenth century: the historian recounts that in the early ninth century, during the transfer of the relics of Saints Faustinus and Jovita from the basilica of San Faustino ad Sanguinem (since 1956 renamed to the church of Sant'Angela Merici), the remains of the two patron saints, during a stop next to Porta Bruciata, would exude blood. Duke Naimon of Bavaria, governor of Brescia, who happened to be in the procession, witnessing the miracle immediately and publicly converted to Catholicism, immediately donating the Illustrious Relic, the Cross of the Field and the banner of the Oriflamme to the abbot of the monastery of Saints Faustinus and Jovita and entering the monastery himself as a monk. Duke Naimon, moreover, was not the first owner of the relic but, again according to the account, had received it as a gift directly from Charlemagne. Towards the end of the 11th century, after an attempted theft, the two crosses were reportedly transferred to the Old Cathedral for better and safer storage.

There is no documentation to support this legend, so much so that it is not even possible to confirm or deny the actual existence of Naimon of Bavaria, a character who appears only in some passages of the Carolingian cycle. The only documented fact of the entire legend is the transfer of the bodies of the two saints, which actually took place on May 9, 806. However, the miracle that took place during the procession can also be said to be documented, but with a margin of doubt, since on the place where the two bodies exuded blood the church of San Faustino in Riposo was founded precisely in the 9th century, which has retained its ancient appellation in reference to the "rest," that is, the pause that the procession made during the miracle.

Andrea Valentini, in 1882, summarizes other legends related to the origins of the relic and the treasure, recovered from writings of earlier authors. The scholar, among others, reports the hypotheses that the Illustrious Relic is linked to the Fourth Crusade, which left Venice in 1202, or that it was brought to Brescia by Alberto da Reggio, a city bishop who was present at the Fifth Crusade between 1219 and 1221, or that it was a gift from Gaudentius or even Philastrius, who allegedly received it directly from St. Helena.

However, the most rooted legend in historical literature subsequent to Malvezzi remains the one linked to the figure of Naimon, at least until the eighteenth century when, first with the studies of Giovanni Girolamo Gradenigo, followed by those of Giuseppe Brunati, Alessandro Sala and Federico Odorici, the critics, linking the style of the decorations on the relic to those of the staurotheke, believed to be a Byzantine work of the 12th-13th centuries, date its arrival in Brescia to the first half of the 13th century, lending credence to the legend that saw Alberto da Reggio as the donor of the Illustrious Relic. Even this conclusion, however, is not considered valid today, since new studies formulated during the twentieth century have convincingly separated, chronologically, the relic from the staurotheke.

In any case, the well-known legend of Naimon of Bavaria narrated by Malvezzi is now to be considered groundless, as Valentini already commented in 1882 suggesting that it should be "relegated to fables," and can be assumed to be a legend that was probably already fixed in the thirteenth century and later rooted by great literary fortune. It also becomes impossible, therefore, to connect the Cross of the Field to the story of the Illustrious Relic: even from a historical point of view, since the two artifacts had different origins and ended up being placed side by side in medieval times, due to the increasingly credited legend of Naimon, simply because they were kept together in the cathedral treasury.

==== The Cross of the Field and the staurotheke ====
The events at the origin of the Cross of the Field, manufactured in the Age of the Communes as the municipal cross of Brescia, to be hoisted on the chariot during battles, are equally unknown. The cross was also called the Cross of the Oriflamme, since on the chariot where it was fixed it towered over the municipal banner, called precisely Oriflamme. A reference to the Cross of the Field can perhaps be found in the hymn of the Battle of Malamorte, and it is Malvezzi again who gives news that, in addition to Rudiano, the cross was raised on the Brescian chariot at the Battle of Grumore and the Battle of Legnano. When the communal era ended, it had to end up simply kept in the treasury, gradually acquiring spiritual value as it was placed side by side with the Illustrious Relic from the legend of Naimon of Bavaria.

Also from the thirteenth century onward, some confusion in the naming of the crosses can be detected in the documents: while the Cross of the Field retains its name unchanged, the Illustrious Relic assumes the title of the Cross of the Oriflamme, when the latter was instead the second name of the Cross of the Field. The error, which remained unchanged for centuries, was corrected only from the nineteenth century onward, when the title "Cross of the Oriflamme" reverted to the second name of the Cross of the Field.

The history of the staurotheke, the original casket of the Illustrious Relic, is also unknown, but it is clear that it was made on purpose. Conversely, it is not known whether it arrived as a replacement for an earlier casket, although the obstinate will for the safekeeping over time of everything that had to do with the Illustrious Relic would be enough to rule out the possibility that a later casket existed and was later discarded.

=== Visconti rule ===
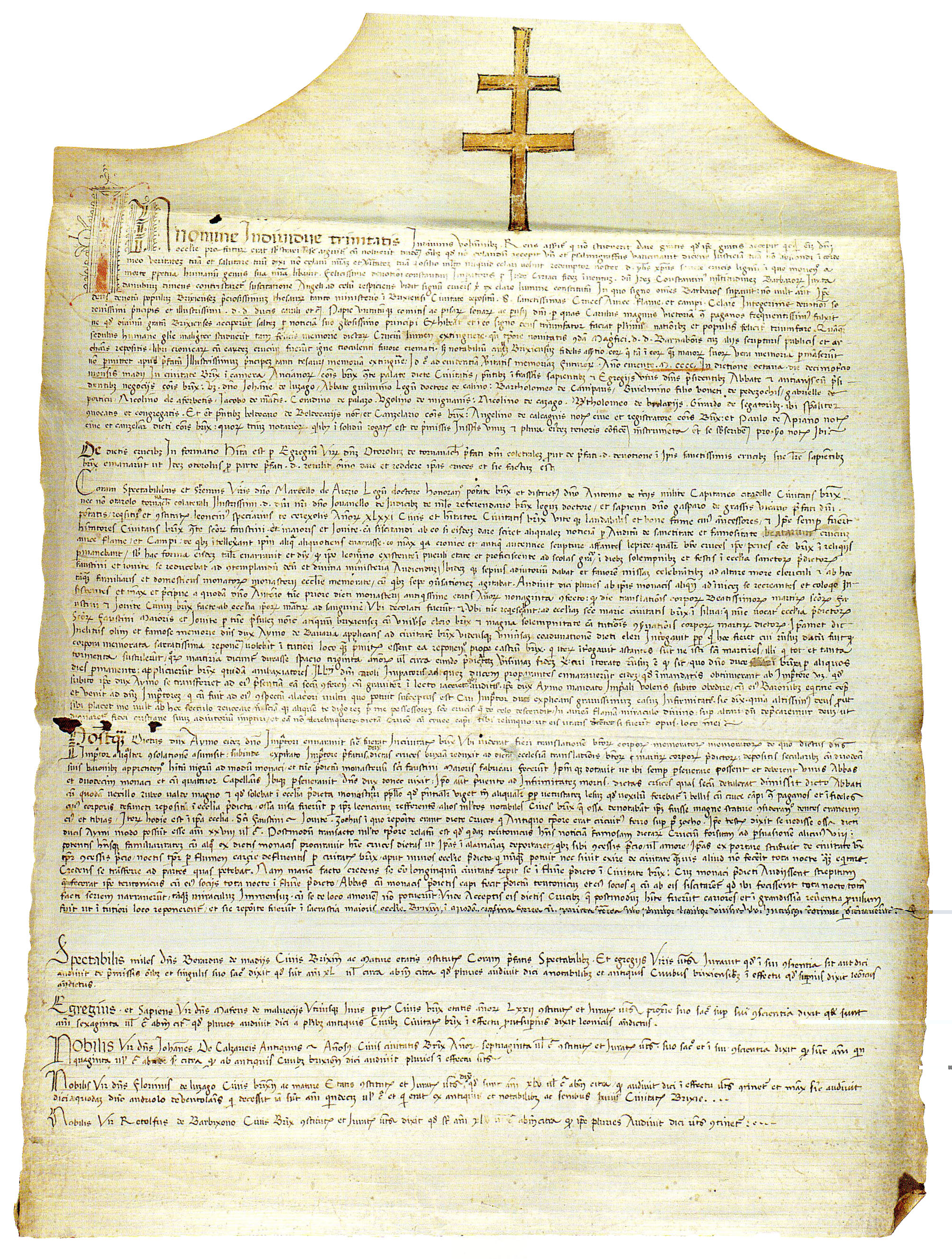
The Memorial Scroll of the Holy Crosses.

During the Visconti rule over Brescia, which began in the first half of the fourteenth century and ended a century later, the treasure must not have enjoyed a good reputation among the lords of the Milanese lineage, probably because of the great devotional fervor that the people of Brescia felt toward the Illustrious Relic. During his regency, Bernabò Visconti thwarted the memory of the treasure by having all the chronicle books, including public and private writings, concerning the memory of the Illustrious Relic and the artifacts kept along with it burned.

However, under Gian Galeazzo Visconti, the situation seems to have improved markedly: on May 13, 1400, a large group of notaries, abbots and lawyers was assembled with the aim of reconstructing the memory of the treasure through the accounts and testimonies of educated citizens, senior citizens or those who were simply able to provide information: the various contributions, after being screened and selected by the group, were collected in a large parchment, known as the Memoir of the Holy Crosses. The main testimony collected is that of the apothecary Leoncino Ceresoli, who recounts that as a boy he worked as an altar boy in the church of Saints Faustinus and Jovita and in his spare moments he would converse with the monks, among them the 90-year-old prior Antonio who had told him the legend of Naimon of Bavaria, which is entirely transcribed in the parchment of the Memoir. The apothecary's tale is confirmed under oath by other town elders, who in turn claim to have heard the same tale from other sources.

The legend is taken verbatim by historian Jacopo Malvezzi in his Chronicon Brixianum ab origine urbis published within a few years of the writing of the memoirs, inaugurating the literary fortune of the legend of Naimon of Bavaria.

=== The treasure in the Renaissance ===
The first known piece of the treasure to be added to the three originals (Cross of the Field, Illustrious Relic and staurotheke) is the small chest made in the first half of the fifteenth century to contain some secondary objects, almost all of which have been lost. The great new arrival, however, occurs in the second half of the century: on August 12, 1474, the Special Council of the city and the General Council on the 30th of the same month commissioned goldsmith Bernardino delle Croci to make a new reliquary for the fragment of the cross, similar to the one the artist was already assembling for the convent of San Domenico (lost), to be delivered by May 1475, that is, the following year.

The work, despite the deadline, did not have to be executed immediately, or else it would take a long time: on June 15, 1486, the Council resolved to recover the money with which to pay Bernardino through the sale of the silverware donated by Domenico de Dominici to the factory of the Duomo. The goldsmith's payment for his work finally arrived in 1487, a full thirteen years after the commission. The reliquary executed by Delle Croci did not initially absolve the relic's new custody: at first, it was simply fixed on top and then carried in procession, as can be seen in Moretto's Holy Cross Standard executed in 1520. When the display was finished, the relic was once again placed in the staurotheke, and the hole left at the top of the pedestal was closed with an ornate silver screw that is still kept in the treasury today, in the small chest.

The beauty of the new processional pedestal and, probably, the innovative Renaissance flurry in the arts led the Special Council to deliberate on August 29, 1532, with confirmation by the General Council on July 31, 1533, on the execution of a new reliquary for the Illustrious Relic to be fixed at the top of the already prepared pedestal, creating a single, large reliquary to replace the old staurotheke. The commission was given to goldsmith Giovanni Maria Mondella, who likely completed it in the following years.

On March 12, 1531, in the Bishop's Palace in Brescia, in the presence of a notary and various authorities from the civil and religious world, Bishop Paolo Zane donated to the community a wooden crucifix, owned by him, composed of two other fragments believed to come from the True Cross. The little cross became part of the heritage of relics of the Old Cathedral, but probably not as a component of the treasure of the Holy Crosses. It would find its final location only in 1841 in the reliquary of the same name by goldsmith Antonio Pedrina, becoming a permanent member of the treasury ever since.

In 1764 Count Bartolomeo Martinengo, president of the Company of the Custodians of the Holy Crosses, had an exact copy of the Cross of the Field made to be used as a processional cross for the regular processions organized by the company, thus avoiding the need to take out the real cross on each occasion. A reproduction of the banner of the Oriflamme, also believed by Valentini to be a copy of the lost original, was added to the new cross.

=== The 19th century ===
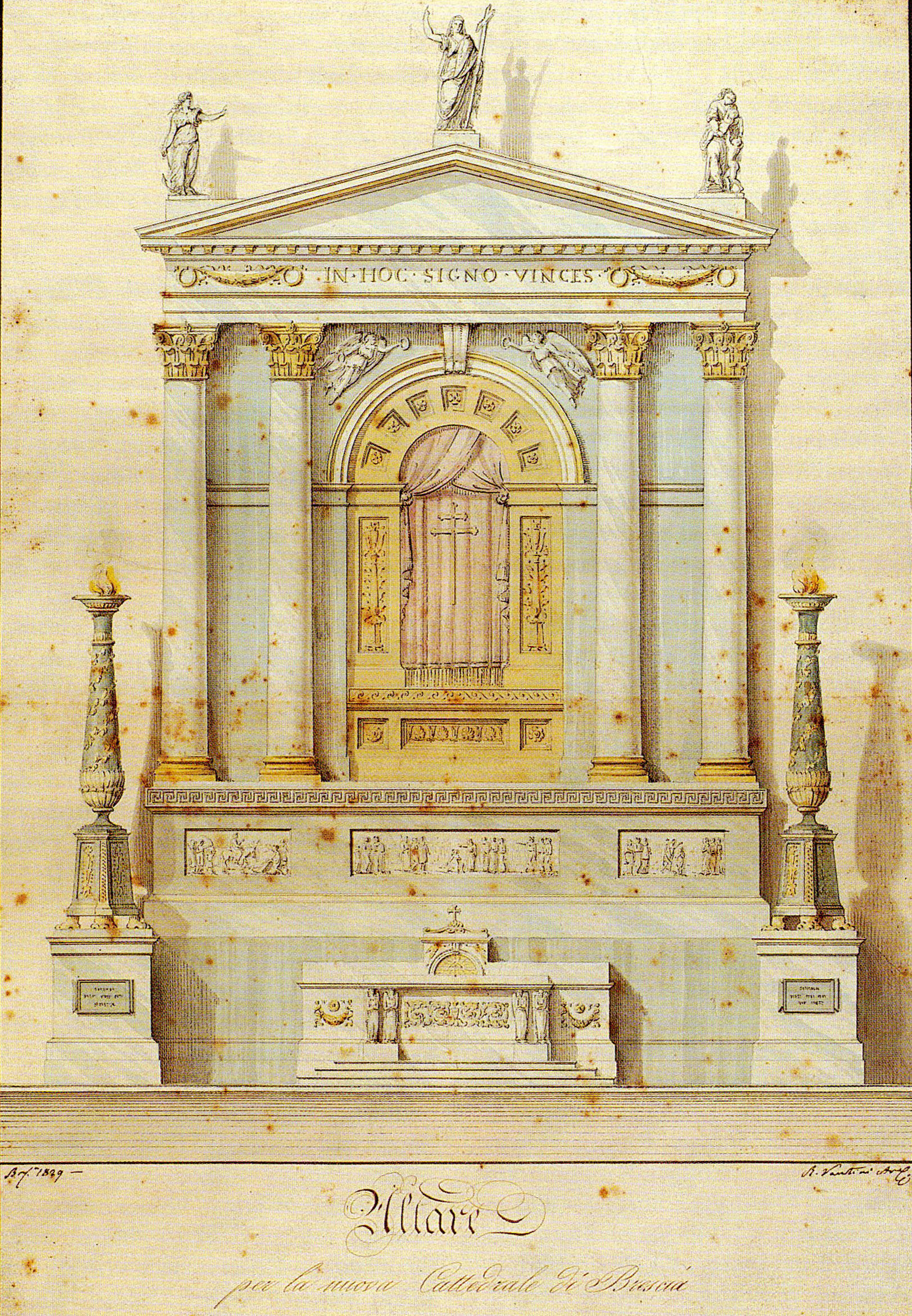
Rodolfo Vantini's 1829 design for the altar of the Holy Crosses to be erected in the New Cathedral.

With the suppression of city monasteries conducted by the Brescian Republic in 1797, the treasure of the Holy Crosses was enriched with two new works transferred there from the monastery of Santa Giulia: the reliquary of the Holy Thorns and the Cross of St. Faustinus, both valuable pieces of Gothic and Renaissance art that expanded the treasure's corpus of religious relics. The reliquary held two thorns believed to have come from the crown of thorns, while the cross contained another, substantial fragment of Jesus' crucifix.

During the procession organized for the Jubilee of 1826, however, the Cross of St. Faustinus and the relic it contained were displayed to the faithful in the Church of Saints Faustinus and Jovita, enjoying great devotional success. The parish priest Giovanni Battista Lurani Cernuschi, accompanied by popular enthusiasm, requested its safekeeping, for which he offered to have a major new altar built in the church where the relic could be placed. The request was granted and, as early as 1828, the fragment of the True Cross was received in the new altar, the first on the right, inside a new, specially fabricated cross-reliquary. The original cross, for better safekeeping, was transferred to the church treasury, leaving the treasury of the Holy Crosses.

During his studies of the Cross of the Field, conducted in 1837, Giuseppe Brunati discovered that under the image of Jesus is carved in the wood a rectangular hollow from the knees to the intersection of the arms, containing numerous relics wrapped in webbing or scrolls with the explanatory inscriptions: a small stone from the Holy Sepulcher, a relic of St. Andrew, a relic of St. Faustinus, and a relic of St. Christopher.

==== Plans for the transfer of the treasure ====
The first proposal, made by Rodolfo Vantini by means of a project, to erect a new, majestic altar in the New Cathedral to which the entire treasure would be transferred dates back to 1829. The altar would be built on the north wall of the transept, mirroring that of the Blessed Sacrament by Vantini himself, which had just been completed. The proposal, though not evident from the documents, must have found a wide following right away: in 1845 two cipollino columns were purchased due to market opportunity "so that they might not be otherwise lost, and in the purpose that they might be employed, whenever that might be, in the altar to be erected in the new cathedral." Other projects, in the same year, were presented by the National Academy of St. Luke in Rome and by the Brescian architect Gaetano Clerici, both of which, however, were considered to be in disharmony with the already present altar of the Blessed Sacrament. In the years immediately following, the heated debate over the new altar continued with the continuous presentation of plans and consultations with schools and institutions, including the Brera Academy. However, as early as 1849, it was the president of the Company of Custodians, Antonio Valotti, who dropped the whole issue, as recorded in a letter between him and Clerici, postponing it "to better times" given the turbulent political situation of the Italian wars of independence.

It was necessary to wait until 1921 for new information on the issue: in that year, the cathedral factory announced a competition for the new altar of the Holy Crosses in the new cathedral, setting first at 3,000 and then at 4,000 liras the prize for the best design. From the opening to the end of the competition, in December 1922, forty designs were delivered and reviewed by a large jury. Surprisingly, the competition was declared null and void, "not finding any of the projects submitted responding in general to the essential concepts" required. However, it was decided to award, as a prize, the sum of 2,000 liras to Giovanni Silvestrini's project and 1,000 liras to Luigi Pellini's. The matter was thus again left unresolved and, partly due to the difficult political and social situation of the following decades, would not be taken up again.

The project of transferring the treasure and erecting a special altar would finally sunset in the 1980s when, in honor of Pope Paul VI, a bronze monument dedicated to him, the work of Lello Scorzelli, finally installed in 1984, would be designed for the north side of the cross vault.

=== The 20th century ===
On April 22, 1917, in the midst of World War I, the Illustrious Relic was displayed on the high altar of the New Cathedral in the presence of Bishop Giacinto Gaggia and almost all the citizens to implore divine protection over the city and the soldiers at the front. On November 10 of the same year, the treasure was extracted extraordinarily to be protected from any damage resulting from the war: the Illustrious Relic was removed from the reliquary case and given to Giacinto Gaggia, while the rest went into the custody of Superintendent Ettore Modigliani and concealed.

A similar situation was repeated on April 13, 1945, during World War II. In total secrecy, the treasure was extracted and hidden: the pedestal of Bernardino delle Croci, the staurotheke, the Cross of the Field, the reliquary of the Holy Thorns and other objects were transferred to a villa in Castenedolo, while the reliquary of Giovanni Maria Mondella, containing the Illustrious Relic, was handed over to Bishop Giacinto Tredici and concealed by him in the niche of a wall of the New Cathedral. However, there are other versions of how and where the treasure was hidden, not all of which agree with each other.

In 1957-58 the entire treasure was restored by Milanese goldsmith Agostino Figini. The staurotheke underwent the most substantial intervention: the casket had many dents, several parts of silver foil had become detached, and the Crucifixion on the lid was corroded by a very powerful acidic agent, poured at an unspecified time and for unknown reasons. During the operation all the worked foils were removed to be restored individually, while the missing parts were supplemented using smooth silver foils. The corroded area, now very friable, was cleaned and the figures strengthened by fillings in pure silver fixed with putty. Finally, the small silver nails were put back in, where they were missing. The Cross of the Field, in the same restoration, was also cleaned and supplemented of the missing fragments, although it was much less damaged than the staurotheke. Similarly, the reliquary and chest were cleaned and arranged.

== The treasure ==
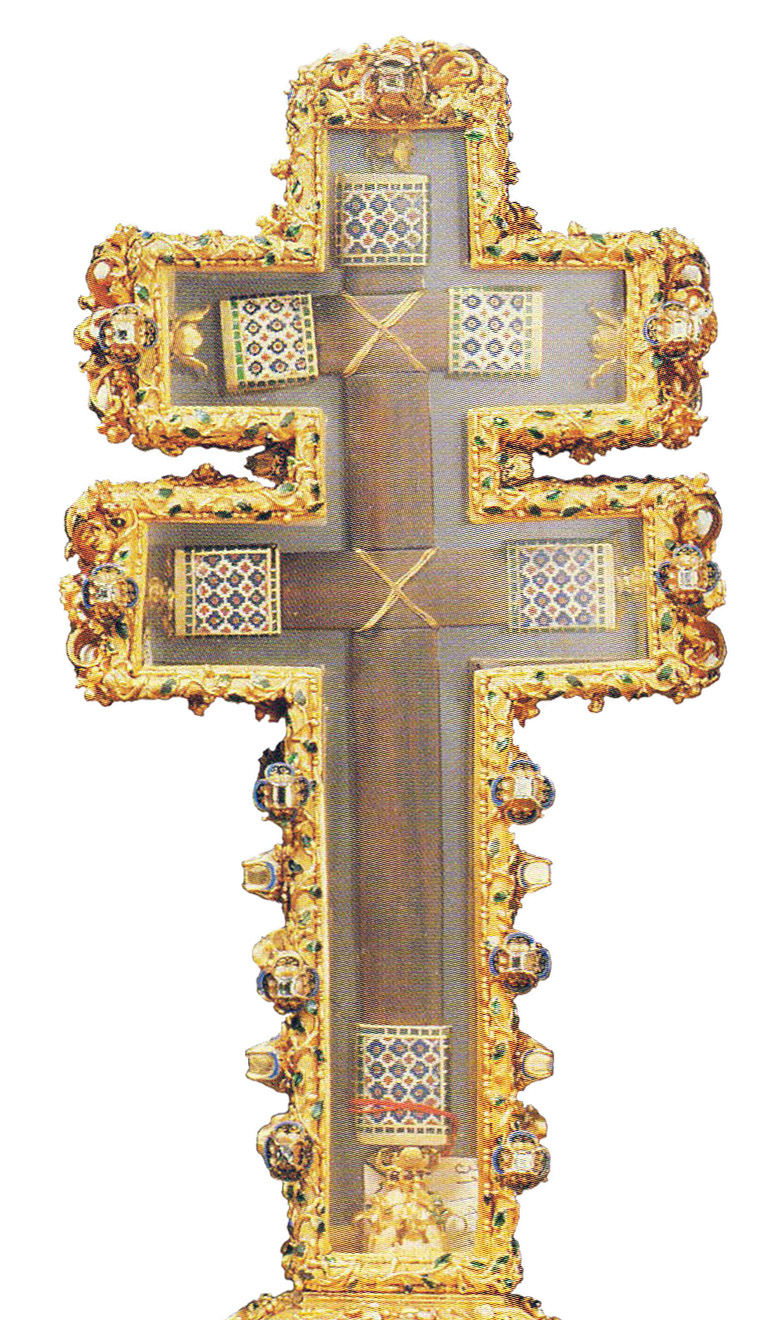
The Illustrious Relic inside the reliquary.

=== The Illustrious Relic of the Holy Cross ===
==== Description and style ====
The Illustrious Relic, the most important piece of the treasure from a religious point of view, consists of three wooden fragments believed to belong to the True Cross, that is, the wooden crucifix on which Jesus supposedly died. They consist of three rectangular cedar wood elements, one 14.5 centimeters long, one 6.5 centimeters and the third slightly less, each about one centimeter wide.

The three pieces are mounted together to reproduce a Latin cross with a double transverse, usually referred to as the "cross of Lorraine" or "patriarchal cross": the longer piece constitutes the central body, while the two shorter ones are the transverse arms, of which the shortest would consist of a reproduction of the titulus crucis. The ends of each piece are hooded in gold sheaths decorated by enamels with floral and geometric patterns in green, blue and red on a white background. In addition, the three pieces are tied together to form the cross by crossed gold threads.

The enamel decoration is of traditional 10th-century Byzantine style, probably produced in Constantinople. There are strong similarities with that of the staurotheke in Limburg an der Lahn from about 960 and with the reliquary of the Holy Cross in the Palatine Basilica of Santa Barbara in Mantua, which also came from Constantinople.

==== Historical and spiritual value ====
The Illustrious Relic has been, for at least a thousand years, the most important relic that has ever attracted the religious faith of the citizens of Brescia. Lodovico Baitelli wrote in 1663:

Volumes would not be enough for those who wish to recall the countless miracles worked by these Most Holy Crosses.

— Lodovico Baitelli, Brief History of the Most Holy Crosses, 1663, pp. 16-27.

Over the centuries, in addition to the two ordinary annual expositions, countless extraordinary expositions were held to carry the relic in procession through the city streets, invoking divine grace for the most diverse reasons: wars, famines, sieges, droughts, epidemics. They include, among many, the procession organized during the siege of Niccolò Piccinino in 1438, the processions to invoke rain implemented from April 13 to 15, 1491, the procession against the famine on March 20, 1523, the one called after the Venetian victory at the Battle of Lepanto, those against the incessant rains on April 20, April 22 and 24, 1663, and December 1727, those, on the contrary, to invoke rain on April 4, 9 and 20, 1683, the exposition of 1705 against the German and French occupation of the territories around the city, and the impressive processions of April 27, May 3 and 11, 1732 for protection against the rinderpest epidemic.

From a historical point of view, the relic has greatly influenced the iconography of the cross in the Brescia area, very often causing the symbol of the patriarchal cross to be preferred in place of the Latin cross in numerous iconographic contexts, from painting to sculpture to miniature.

==== Other images ====
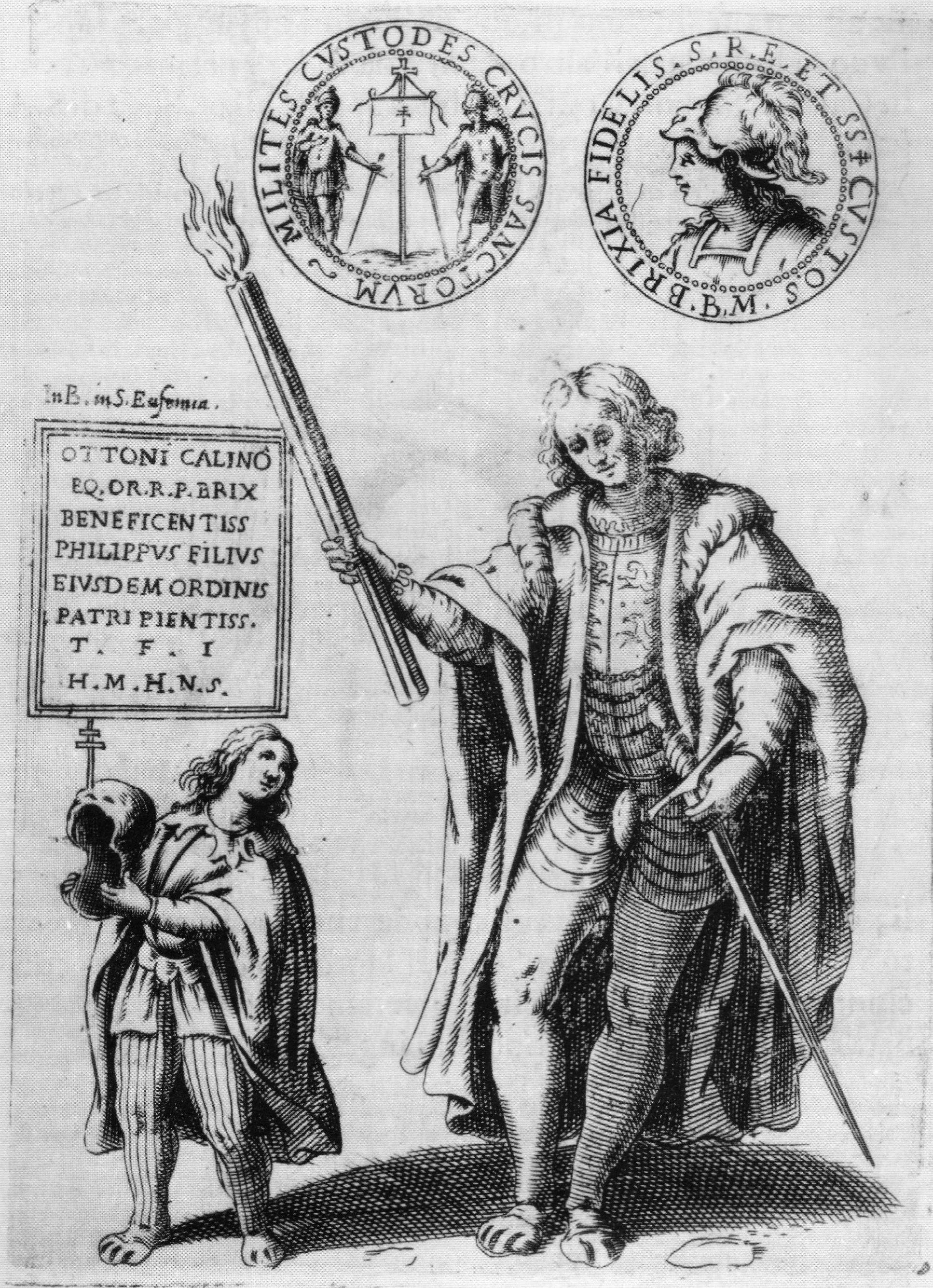
Ottavio Rossi, frontispiece of Le Memorie Bresciane, opera historica, e simbolica, engraving, 1616.

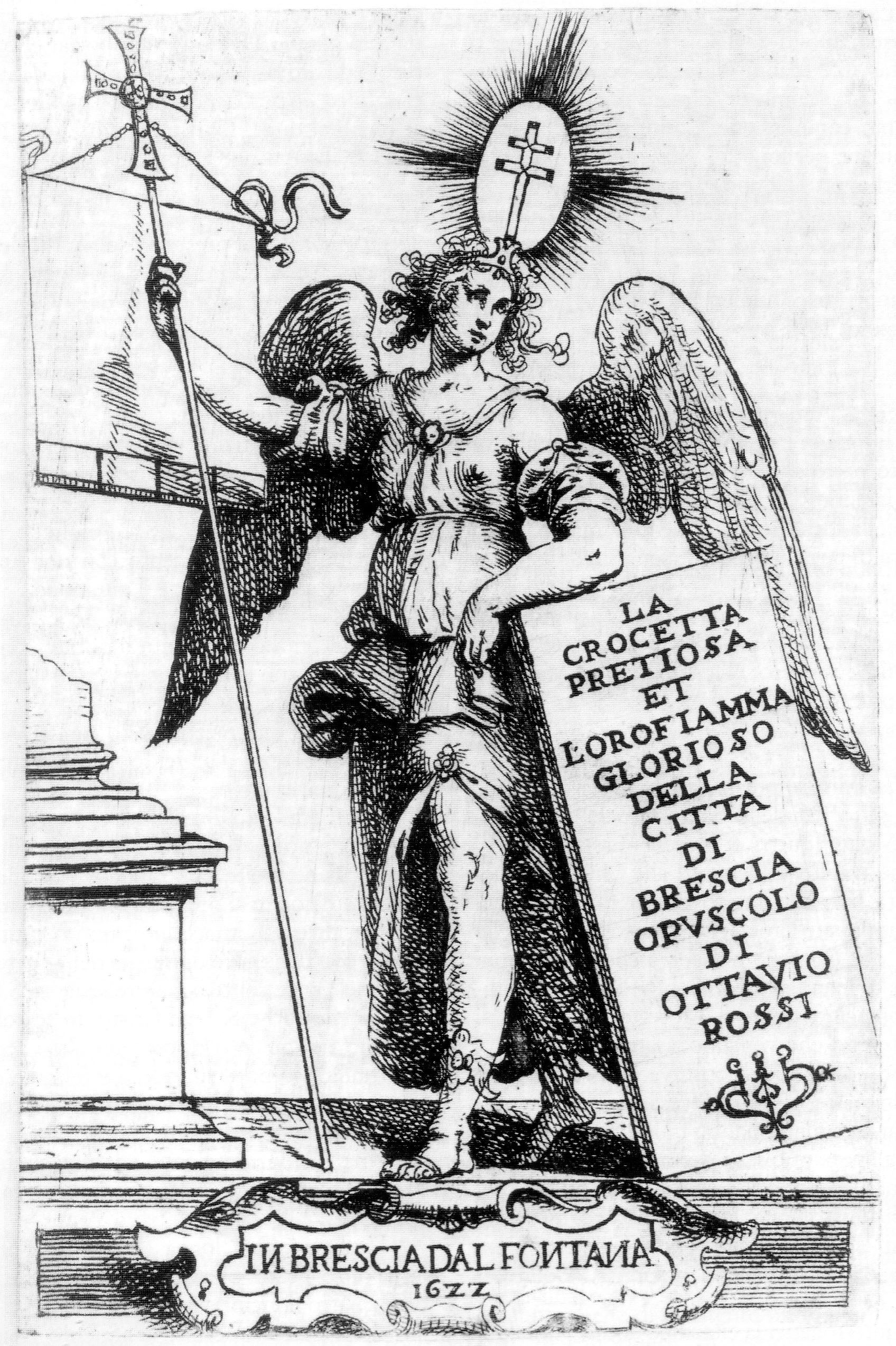
Ottavio Rossi, frontispiece of La Crocetta Pretiosa et l'Orifiamma Glorioso della Città di Brescia, engraving, 1622.

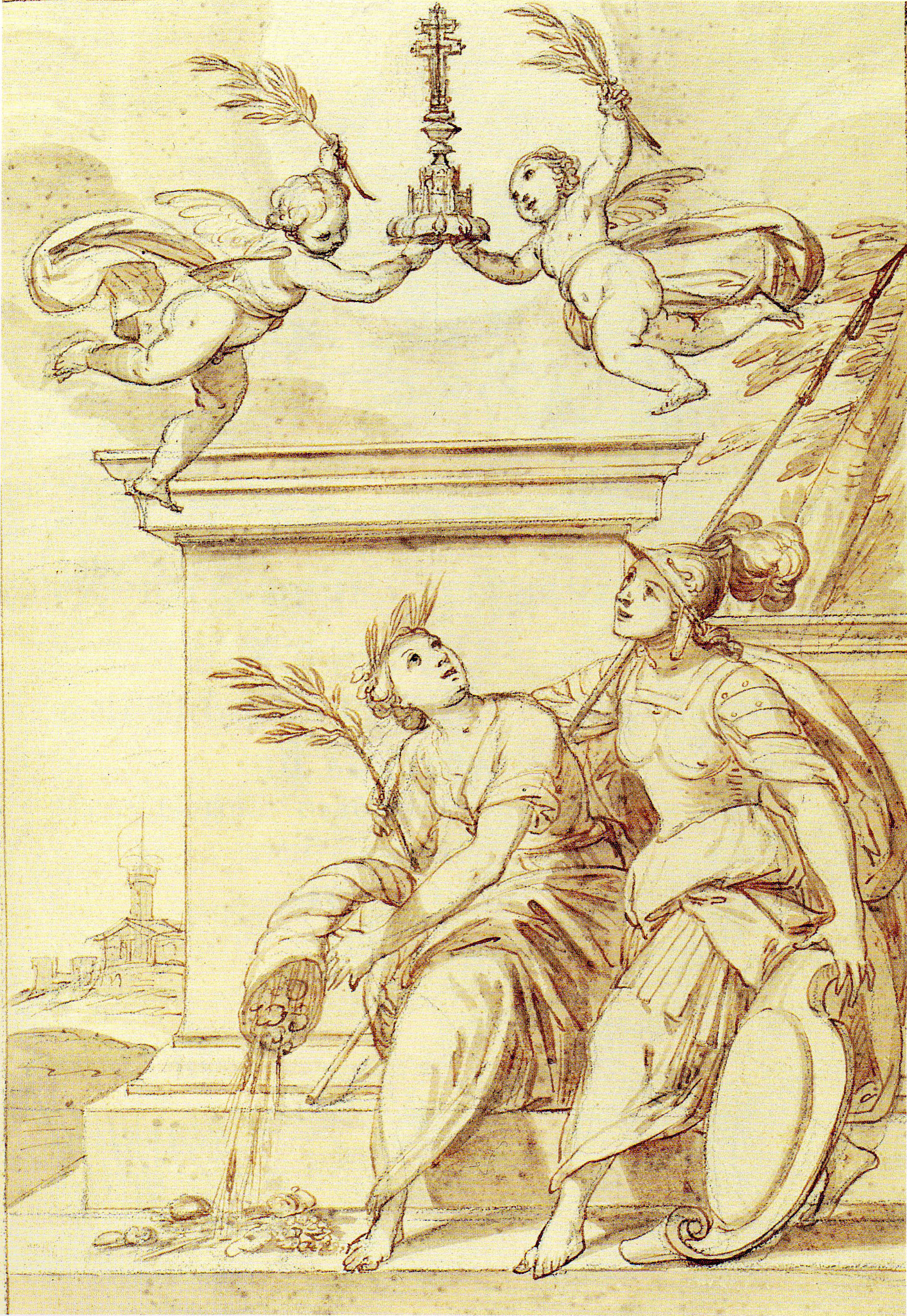
Francesco Paglia, Brescia armed and Peace protected by the Holy Cross, pen and watercolor on paper, 1683.

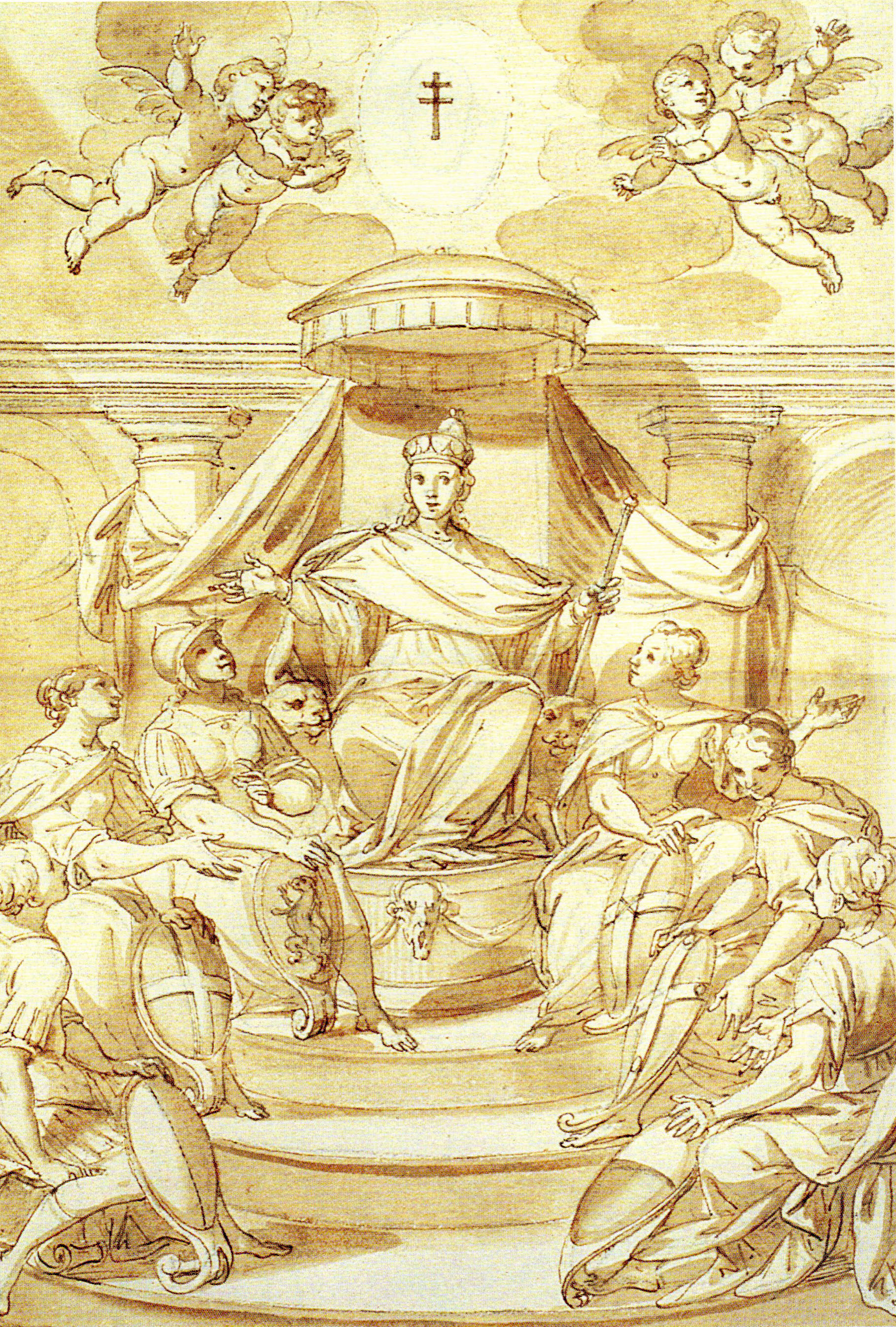
Francesco Paglia, Venice honored by Brescia and the cities of the Republic, pen and watercolor on paper, 1683.

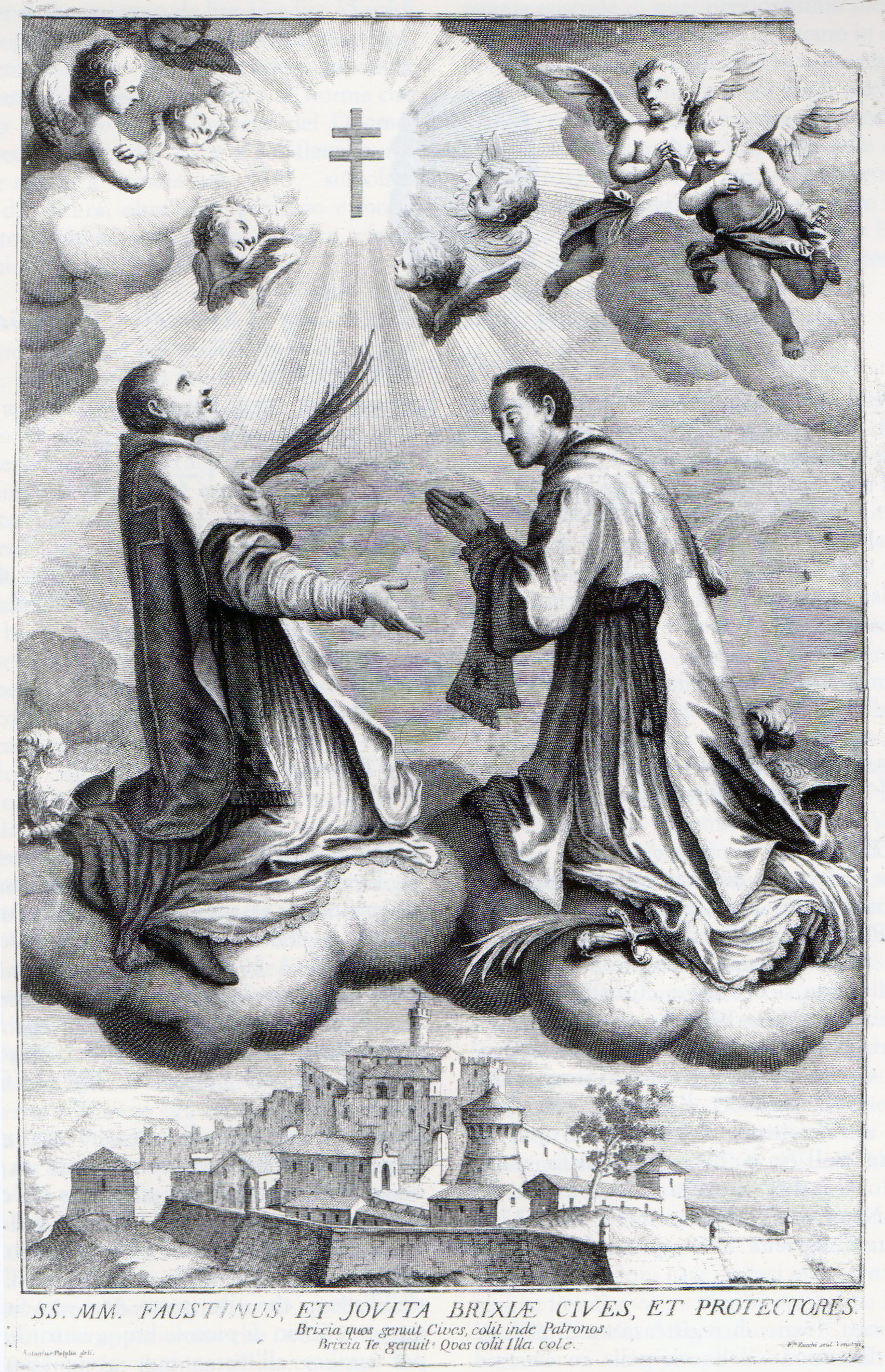
SS.MM. Faustinus et Jovita Brixiae et Protectores, engraving, c. 1750.

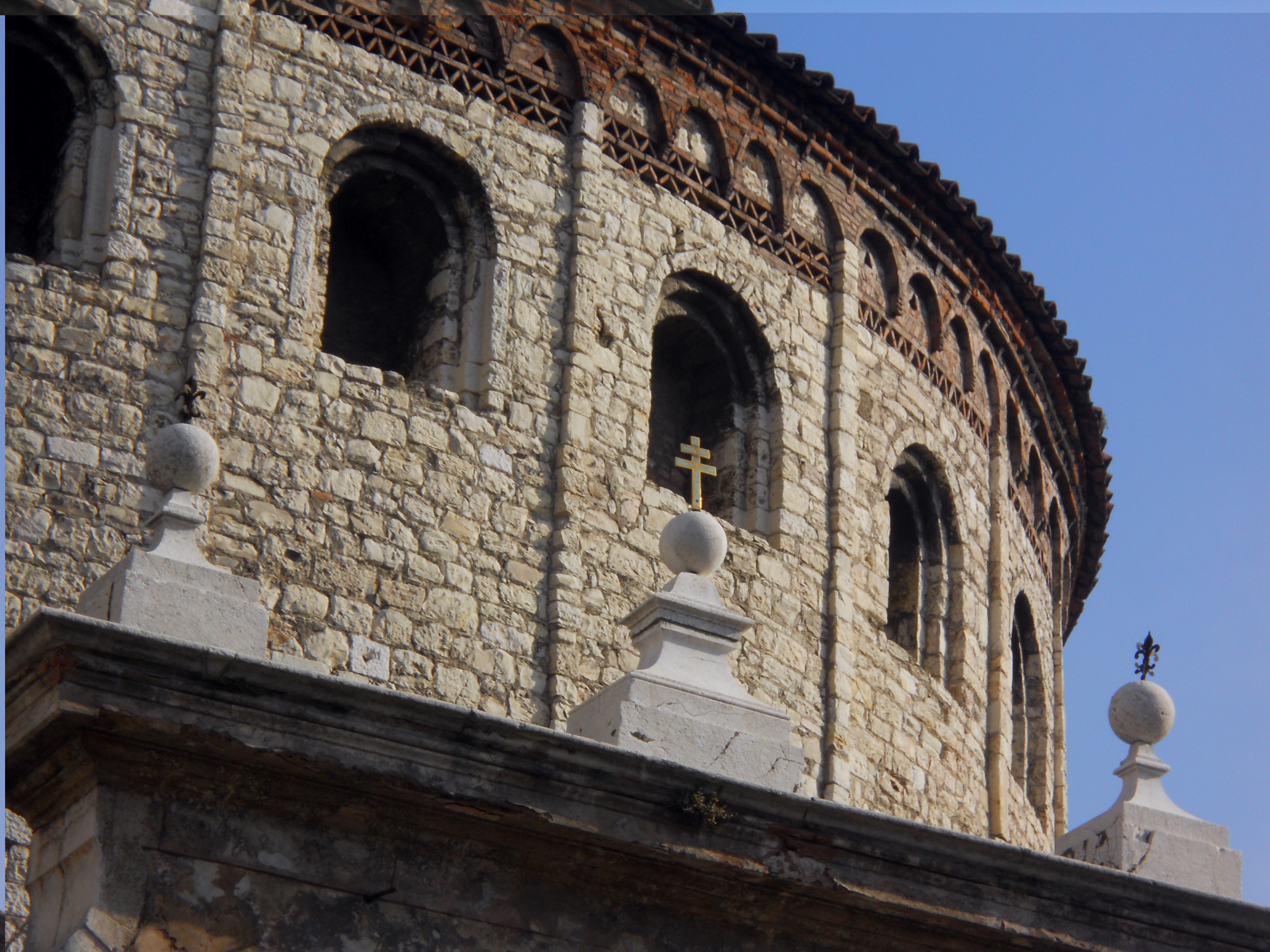
Reproduction of the Illustrious Relic on the entrance portal to the Old Cathedral.

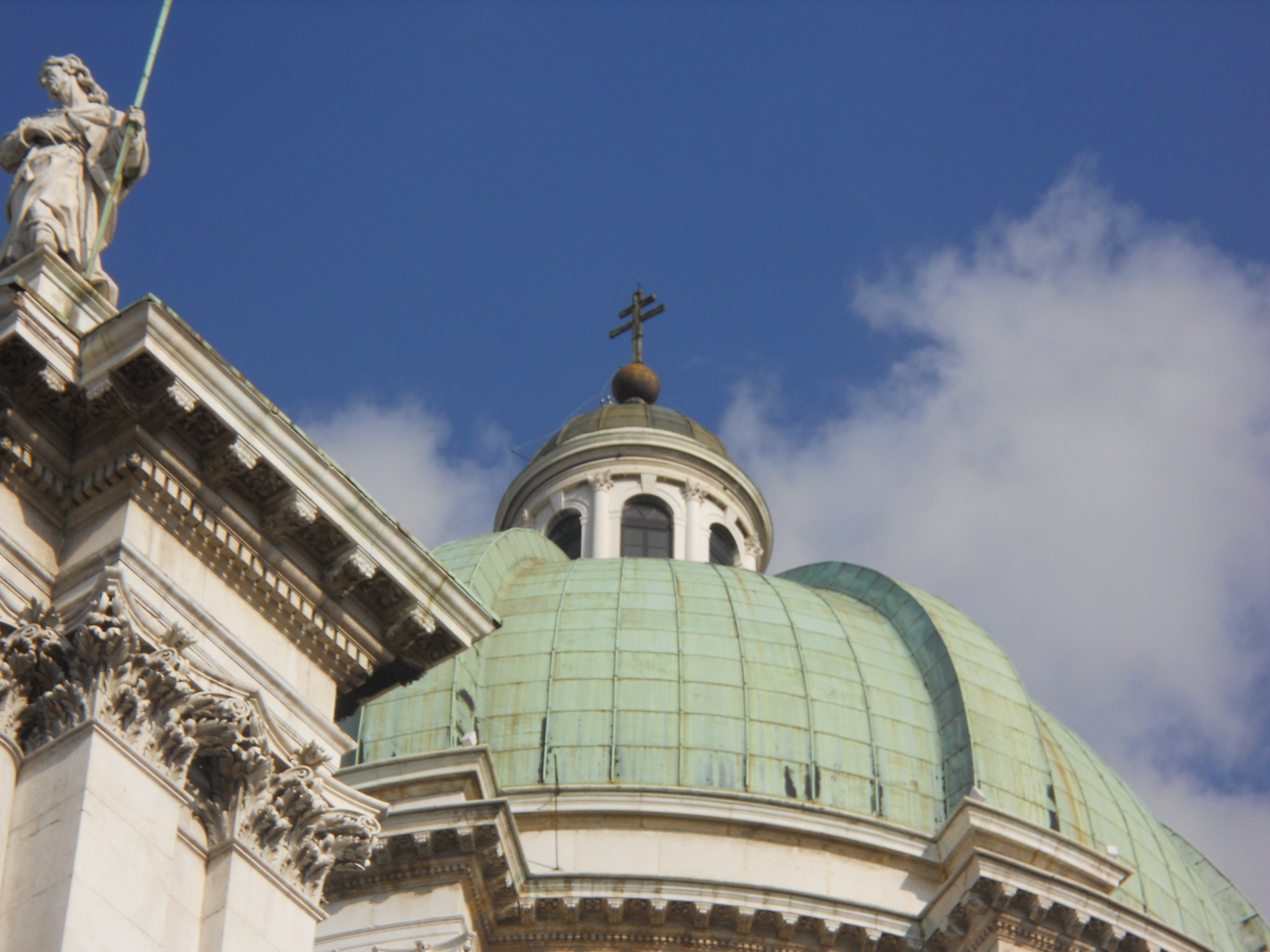
Double cross at the top of the dome of the New Cathedral.

=== The staurotheke ===
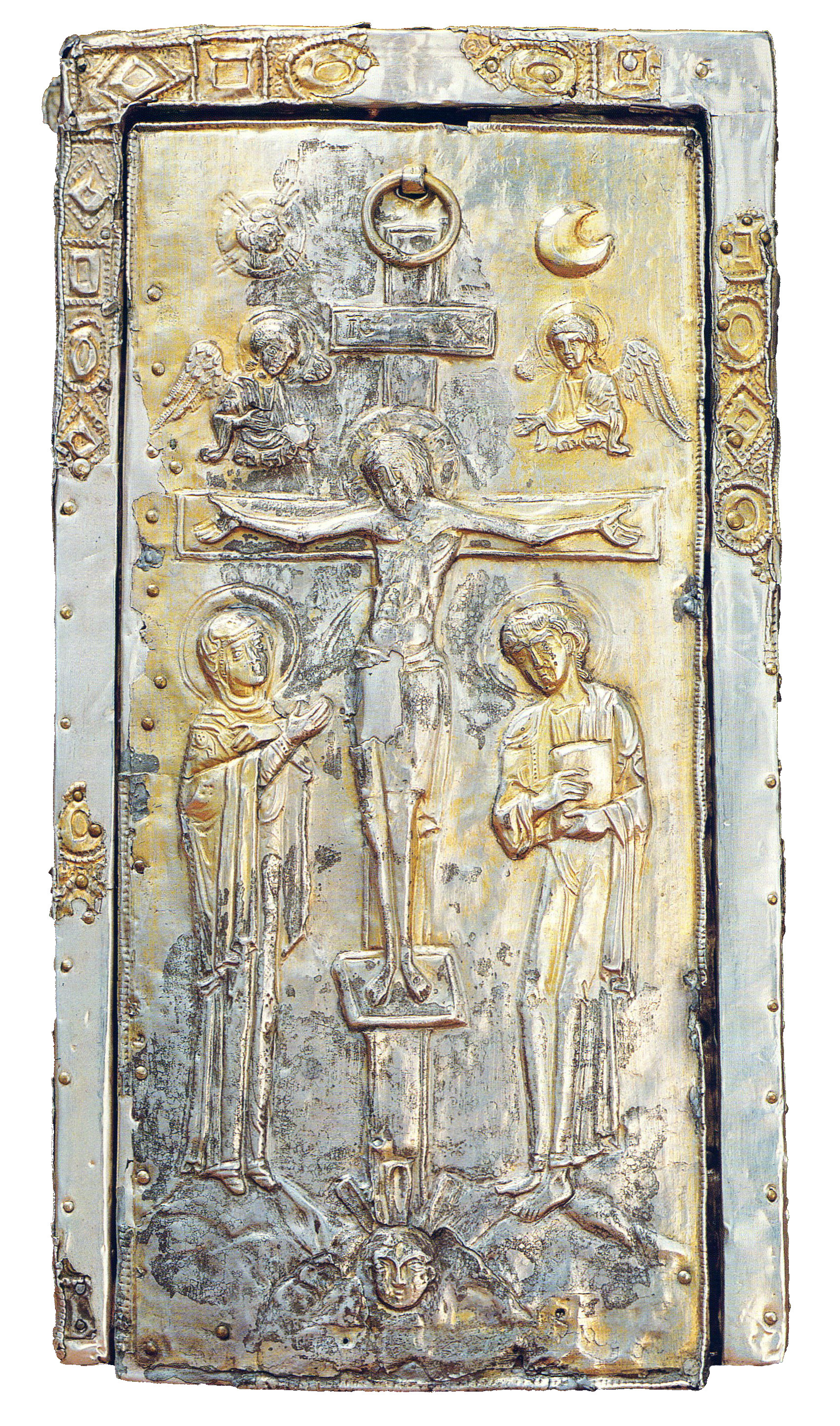
The closed staurotheke.

==== Description ====
The staurotheke is the casket that served as the custody of the Illustrious Relic until 1532, when it was transferred to the new reliquary. It is a rectangular case, 17.8 centimeters high, 9.5 centimeters wide and three centimeters thick, made of wood covered with a thin sheet of pure silver originally gilded with mercury on every surface, although only faint hints of the gold patina remain. The foil covers every surface of the casket: the lid, the interior, and the four contour sides. The decoration that characterizes the staurotheke is rich in religious symbols, the main theme of which centers on the crucifixion of Jesus. Of particular note is that it is not a true embossed work, as the foil was not worked by tapping it from the back, but was forced by using irons and stones.

A border encircles the lid on three sides (the fourth is connected with the interior of the case) divided by thin cords into squares occupied alternately, but without rigid succession, by square, rhombus, or ovoid decorative motifs, which in turn are enclosed in a cord. The motif effectively imitates a lap of set stones, but has been largely lost. The lid depicts the crucifixion scene: in the center is the wooden cross on which Jesus is nailed, with a crusading halo around his head reclining to the left and a cloth tied around his hips. The legs descend parallel and the feet are nailed separately on a square footrest.

On the left is Mary with her face expressing sorrow, while on the right is St. John with the book of the Gospels clutched to his chest, both richly attired. Both the cross and the two lateral figures are placed atop pyramidal mounds, and the central one, from which the crucifix rises, has at its base the face of a man with closed eyes with three pieces of wood embedded in his head. This man can be identified with Adam, a symbol of the multitude of the righteous resurrected at the time of Jesus' death. At the top of the cross hangs the titulus crucis with the inscription "IC XC," meaning Iésus Christós, completing the iconography of the double transverse cross. Above the horizontal arm of the cross, on either side of the titulus, are depicted two half-length angels with wings and tunic and a veil in their hands, in an attitude of sorrowful veneration. Above, in remembrance of the solar eclipse that occurred at the death of Jesus, are the Sun on the left, depicted as a radiating disk, and a crescent moon and right, a symbol of the Moon. Finally, attached to the top of the cross is the ring that allows the casket to be opened. The staurotheke can be opened by sliding downward the lid, which slides along two rail guides.

Inside the casket is recessed the seat of the relic, which repeats the shape of a patriarchal cross, covered with red velvet. Four full sectors remain around the recess: the two lower rectangular panels are decorated with the figures of Constantine on the left and Flavia Julia Helena on the right, frontal, rigid and absorbed. The two emperors stand on barely sketched pyramidal mounds and are depicted within sumptuous gemlike robes, executed in deep detail. Inscribed alongside the two figures are their respective names in Greek: "AKOCT / ANTINC" for Constantine and "HAΓIAE / ΛENH" for Helena (Constantine's first "A" is inscribed in a circle). Serving as bases for the two emperors are two frames decorated with opposing foliage and palmettes, while at the top, between the recesses housing the cross's transverse arms, are two angels repeating those on the lid. Finally, the rib of the casket is decorated with a succession of circular medallions with an internal floral motif, but it has not been preserved in its entirety.

==== Style ====
The fine embossed silver work is to be considered stylistically in accordance with the 11th-century Lombard artistic tradition, with numerous Byzantine elements and references to Ottonian art of the period. Very strong are the connections with the blanket of the lost evangeliary of Aribert of Monza, while other references, especially in the framing with imitation set stones, are to the evangeliary also by Aribert preserved in the treasure of Milan Cathedral, both Lombard works of the 11th century. Other similarities are with the cover of the Liber Evangeliorum in the Capitular Library of Vercelli, a Lombard artwork again from the second half of the 11th century in terms of the general composition of the frames and curbs.

Even more notable are the similarities with the staurotheke preserved in the National Gallery of the Marches in Urbino from the monastery of Fonte Avellana, with which the Brescia staurotheke shares the accentuated Byzantinism. While the Urbino staurotheke is more refined and endowed with a greater sense of stylization, the Brescian staurotheke is characterized by a more evident expressionism given by the modeling, the blurred contours of the figures, and the psychological rendering of feelings. These are therefore elements that testify to a post-Ottonian influence on Lombard masters working with Byzantine bases, the artistic climate within which the Brescian staurotheke was produced.

==== Other images ====
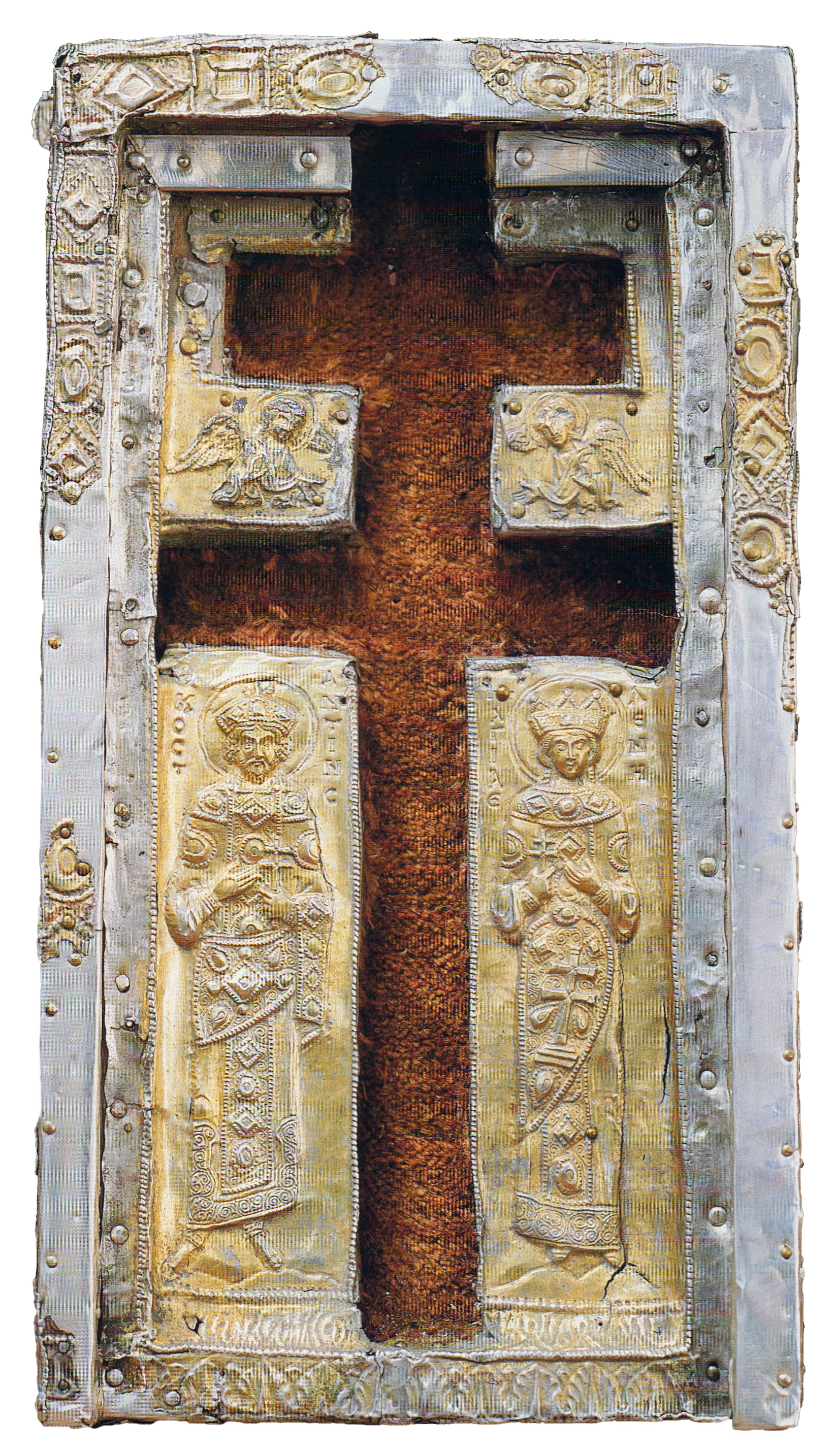
The open staurotheke.

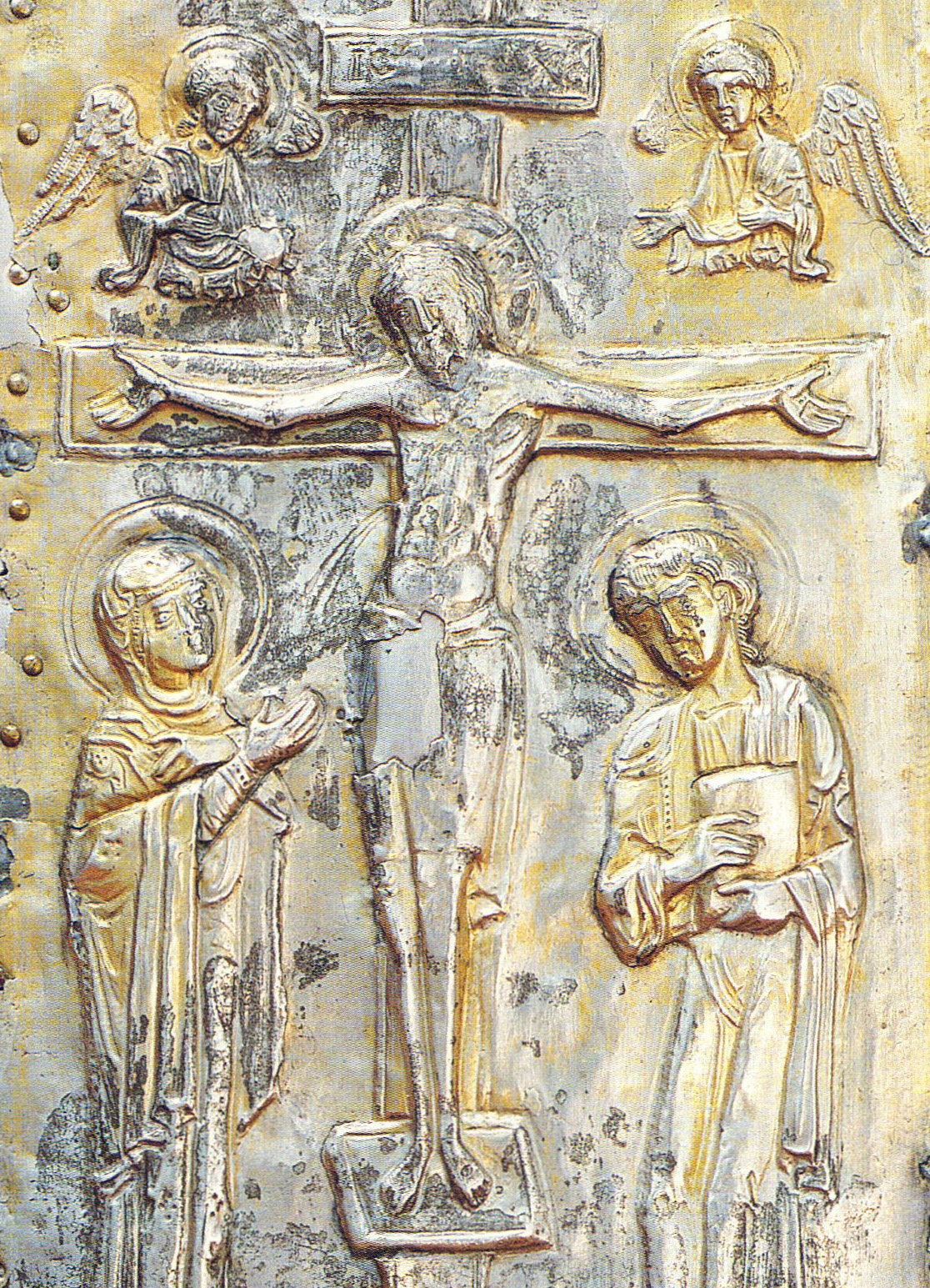
Detail of the Crucifixion.

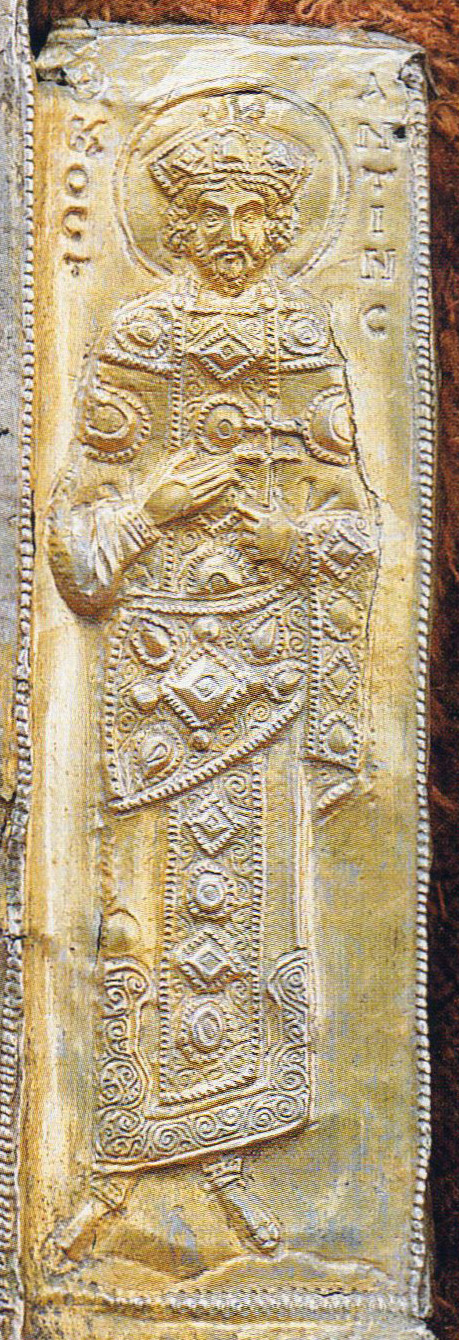
Detail of Constantine.

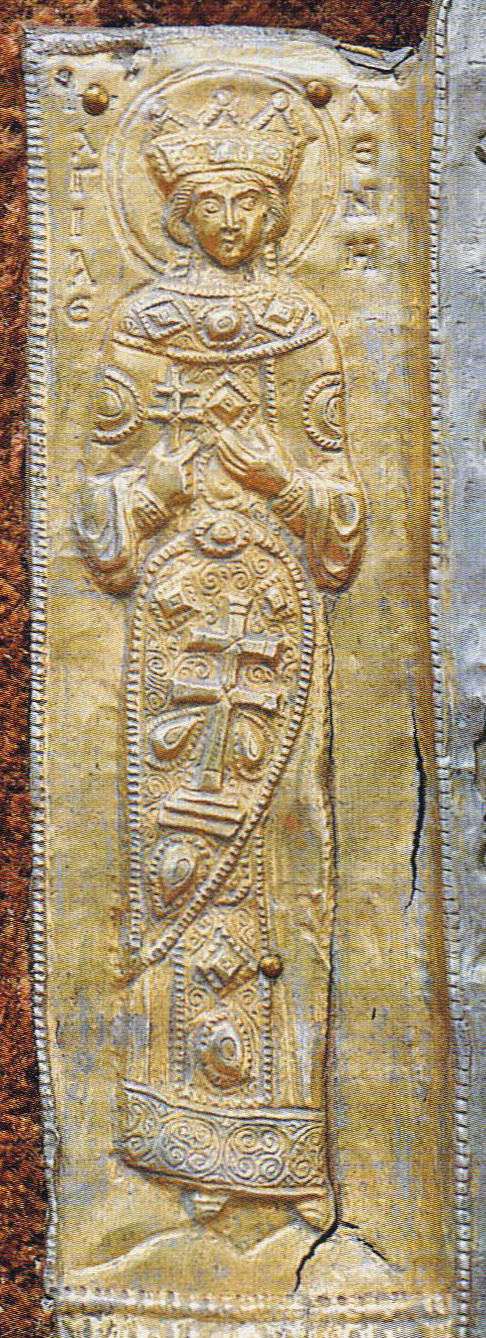
Detail of Helena.

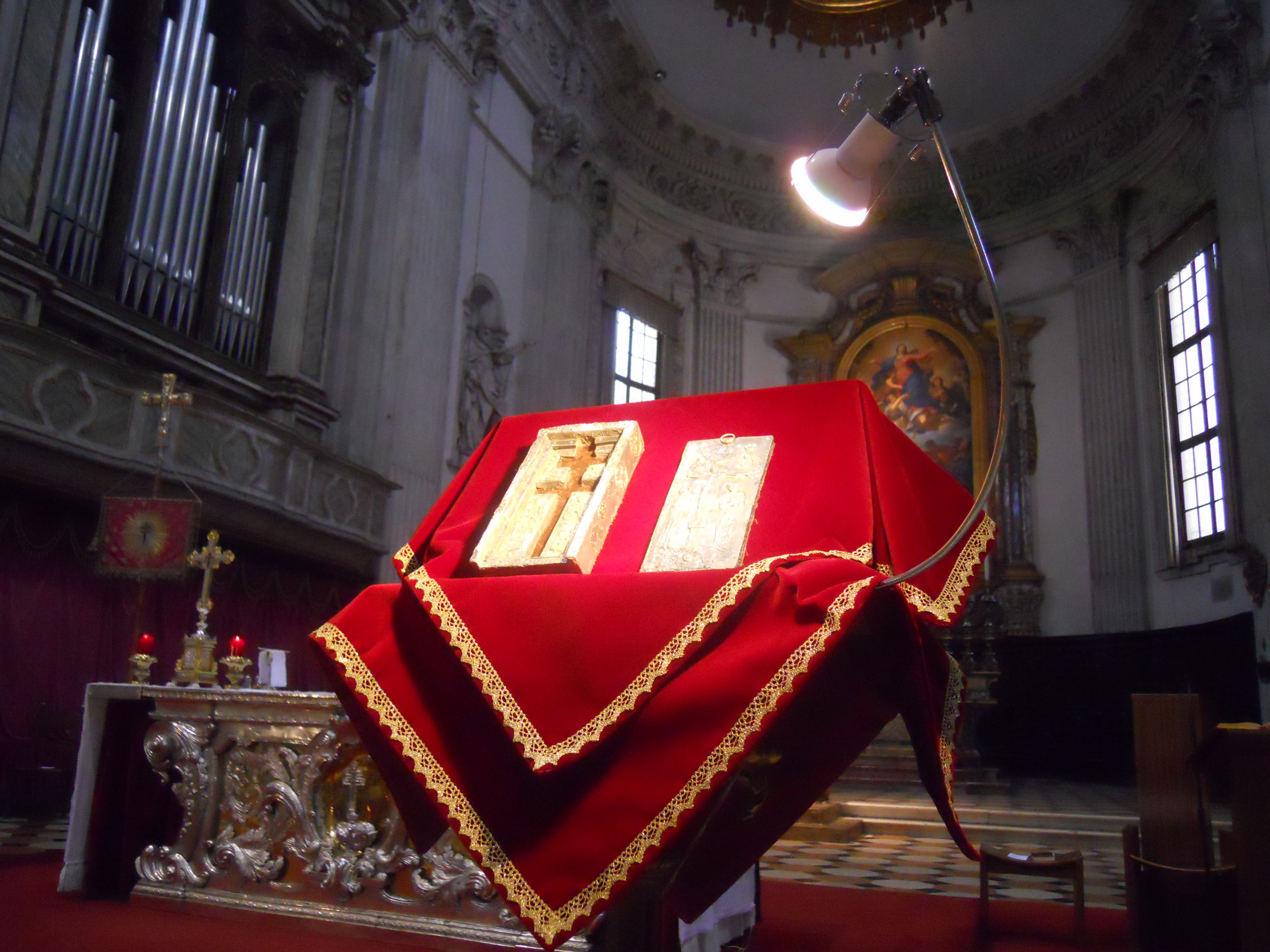
The staurotheke displayed in the New Cathedral.

=== The reliquary ===
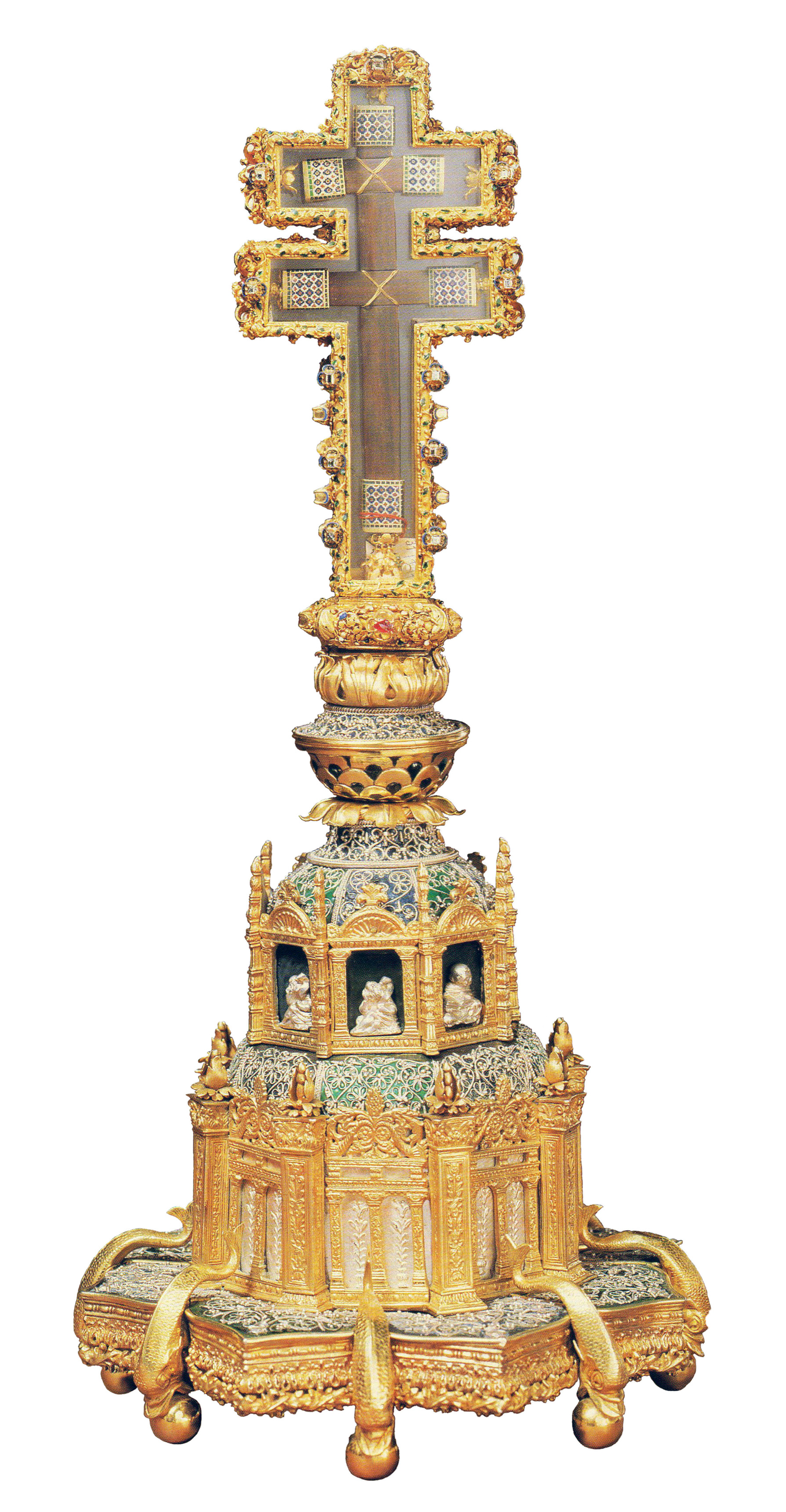
The reliquary of the Holy Cross.

==== Description ====
The large gilded reliquary has been the custody of the Illustrious Relic since 1532, when the upper reliquary was added. The lower pedestal, on the other hand, as mentioned, was made in the second half of the 15th century by Bernardino delle Croci as a support for the relic during processions. It is a very fine work of sculpture and jewelry 44.5 centimeters high and 21.5 wide at the base, made of gold, silver and enamels, all studded with a variety of gems and precious materials.

The work, fully cast, rests on eight gold spheres held by dolphin mouths descending from above, placed in the center of the concave sides of the octagonal mixtilinear base adorned with foliate motifs and astragal and beaded moldings. The first base shelf is divided into eight ogee segments alternately decorated with blue and green enamel, which in turn is covered with dense embroidery of silver filigree depicting, on each segment, an amphora on the outer edge from which symmetrical giral branches with silver balls branch out. On this base is set the first octagonal elevation, framed at the corners by rich lesenes of Corinthian order very much projected and ornamented with candelabra, on the top of which rise flower-shaped pinnacles worked with chisel. On each side of the octagon are architraved biforas surmounted by cymatiums with cornucopias, foliage, rosettes, and a central pine cone. The pilasters of the biforas themselves are decorated with candelabras, astragals, and denticles, while on each silver background is an amphora with a vertical sprig and a lily flower at the end. This first octagonal level is crowned by a portion of the hemispherical calotte also divided into enameled compartments decorated as at the base.

Set on the calotte is the second level, which repeats the one below in form and type, but the corner pilasters and related pinnacles are richer and more composite in the alternation of architectural and floral elements. The niches are no longer mullioned but have only two side pilasters with an upper lintel, complemented by a semicircular cymatium with a central shell and crowning palmette. Within the niches, which are slightly concave and enameled in very dark green, stand out silver half-length figures in full casting: six are identifiable as prophets since they bear cartouches, while two depict old men with beards and a large open volume in their hands, possibly Apostles. The second level also concludes with a glazed hemispherical cap, identical to the one below in alternating glazes and filigree embroidery. In the center of the cap, from a ring also decorated with filigree, arises a series of leaves from which rises a chalice with a surface covered with a scale motif and the upper part covered again with filigree. Out of this emerges a tuft of acanthus leaves enclosing the hole where the relic on display was originally inserted, which was closed by an ornate screw-head when the latter was removed. The pedestal by Bernardino delle Croci, later completed with the reliquary by Giovanni Maria Mondella commissioned in 1533, ends there.

The reliquary, in the shape of a double cross, like the relic, is made of two very thick quartz crystals, framed in gold. The ribbing, which surrounds and clamps the two quartz slabs, is pure gold work (1000/1000) partly done by chiseling, on the sides, and partly by casting, in the decorations on the heads of the arms. The perimeter is adorned with a continuous vine branch with dense foliage and bunches of grapes where four-lobed flowers enameled in red, green, and blue with a square-cut diamond set in the center are laid in regular succession, while other diamond heads adorn the edge. In total, there are twenty-eight flowers and heads set with as many diamonds, plus four pearls in the flowers on each of the heads of the two horizontal arms. The reliquary rests on a safety ring, which concurs with the opening of the reliquary itself, formed of a square solid gold slab decorated with red and green enameled foliage with a ruby in the center on each side. Finally, inside the reliquary are six lily-shaped gold chalices that hold the relic at the heads of the arms.

The two parts of the reliquary still retain the signatures of the authors: on the bottom of the pedestal is legible the signature of Bernardino delle Croci with the inscription ". BER'. PARA. ARG. OPERA.", while under the safety ring of the reliquary is Mondella's, ". 10. M. MONDELLA. AURIF. FECIT."

==== Style ====
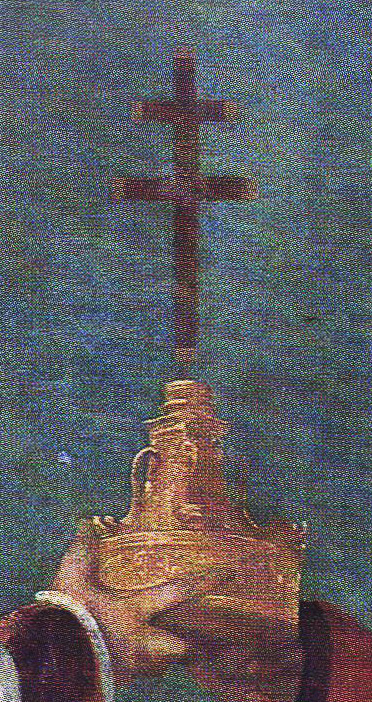
Bernardino delle Croci's pedestal in Moretto's Holy Cross Standard.

The difference in style and craftsmanship between the pedestal and the reliquary appears obvious, even from the point of view of materials and technique of execution. A noble sense of construction is dominant in the pedestal: the decoration, though very rich and detailed, is only an addition to the predominant architectural concept borrowed from the centrally planned churches, with spiritual significance already very much in vogue in central Italy at the time and which was developing with increasing vitality also in Lombardy. The workmanship is meticulous, subtle, typical of the decorative style that characterized the Lombard Renaissance, but it fails to distract from the architectural scheme. In Delle Croci's reliquary, however, some Gothicizing elements remain, detectable in the various pinnacles, especially in those on the second level, and in the general conception of the architectural parts, nothing more than a pure formal translation of the Gothic biforas and cusps used in coeval (if not even later) works such as the Cross of San Faustino or the reliquary of the Holy Thorns. The work, therefore, stands qualitatively as one of the greatest achievements of Lombard proto-Renaissance goldsmithing.

In Mondella's reliquary, on the contrary, the decorative element appears to be prevalent: the architectural conception decays to be replaced by a uniquely pictorial vision, a rich refined preciosity, moreover perfect from the technical side. The use of precious gems (twenty-eight diamonds, sixteen pearls, and four rubies) is also deployed in the reliquary, and the piece is made entirely of pure gold, as opposed to the gilded silver of the pedestal. Despite these stylistic differences, however, the two parts agree with each other and tie together equally well in a unity that, on an overall view, appears real.

Finally, as far as the pedestal is concerned, it can be observed that the dolphins at the base are hollow on the inside and are chiseled, while at the spheres, at the bottom of the reliquary, there are six holes. This would lead to the conclusion that both the dolphins and the balls are of later date and that, originally, there was another type of support. The rest of the pedestal is completely worked by casting, as mentioned earlier, while no other justification would be found in the six holes under the pedestal other than that of a remaking of the supports. A deed of payment, dated April 17, 1517, in which the Company of the Custodians welds a "restoration of the plinth" of the pedestal performed to bring it back into "good and laudable form," an intervention identifiable with this supposed revision of the plinth, is preserved in regard to this issue. Illustrative, moreover, is the reproduction of the reliquary visible in Moretto's Holy Cross Standard, which, painted in 1520, appears to stylize the presence of dolphins.

The reliquary's casket is preserved, and is still in use, where it is stored when the treasure is not on display, locked inside the safe of the Holy Crosses chapel. It is the original 15th-century wooden, tall, hexagonal hood, with the handle, hinges and hooks of the time. Eighteenth-century additions, on the other hand, are the borders on the corners, in gilded metal, and the outer covering in red cloth. The hood, in the past, must have been held in no small esteem considering that, in an account of the ceremonial opening of the treasury compiled in 1683, it is referred to as "the Holy Deposit, or shall we say Sanctuary."

==== Other images ====
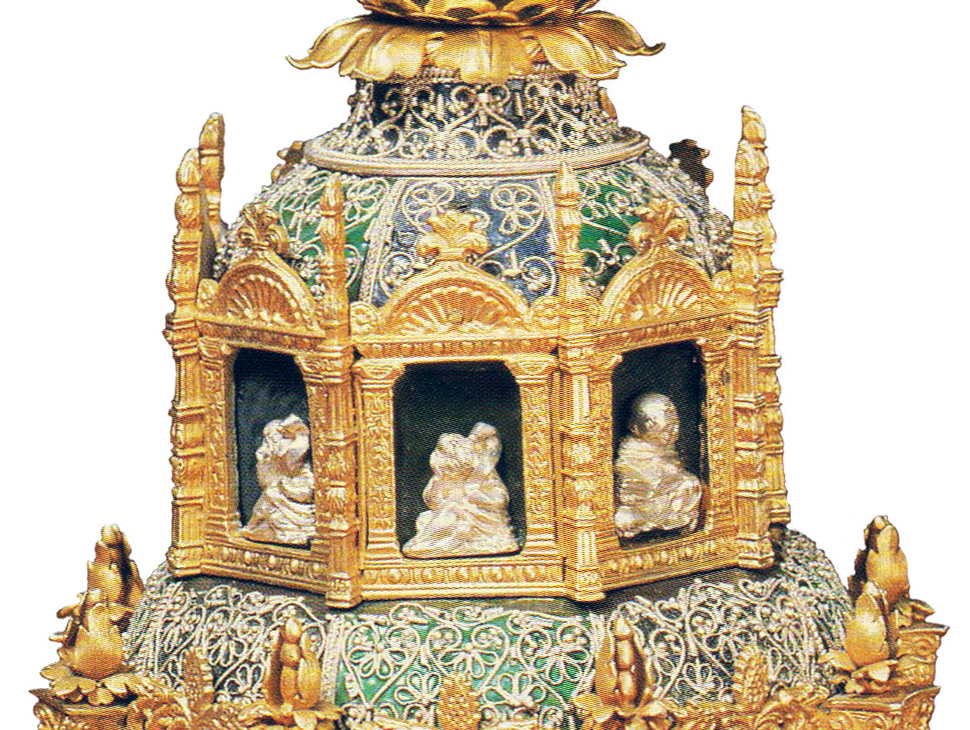
Detail of the second level with silver busts.

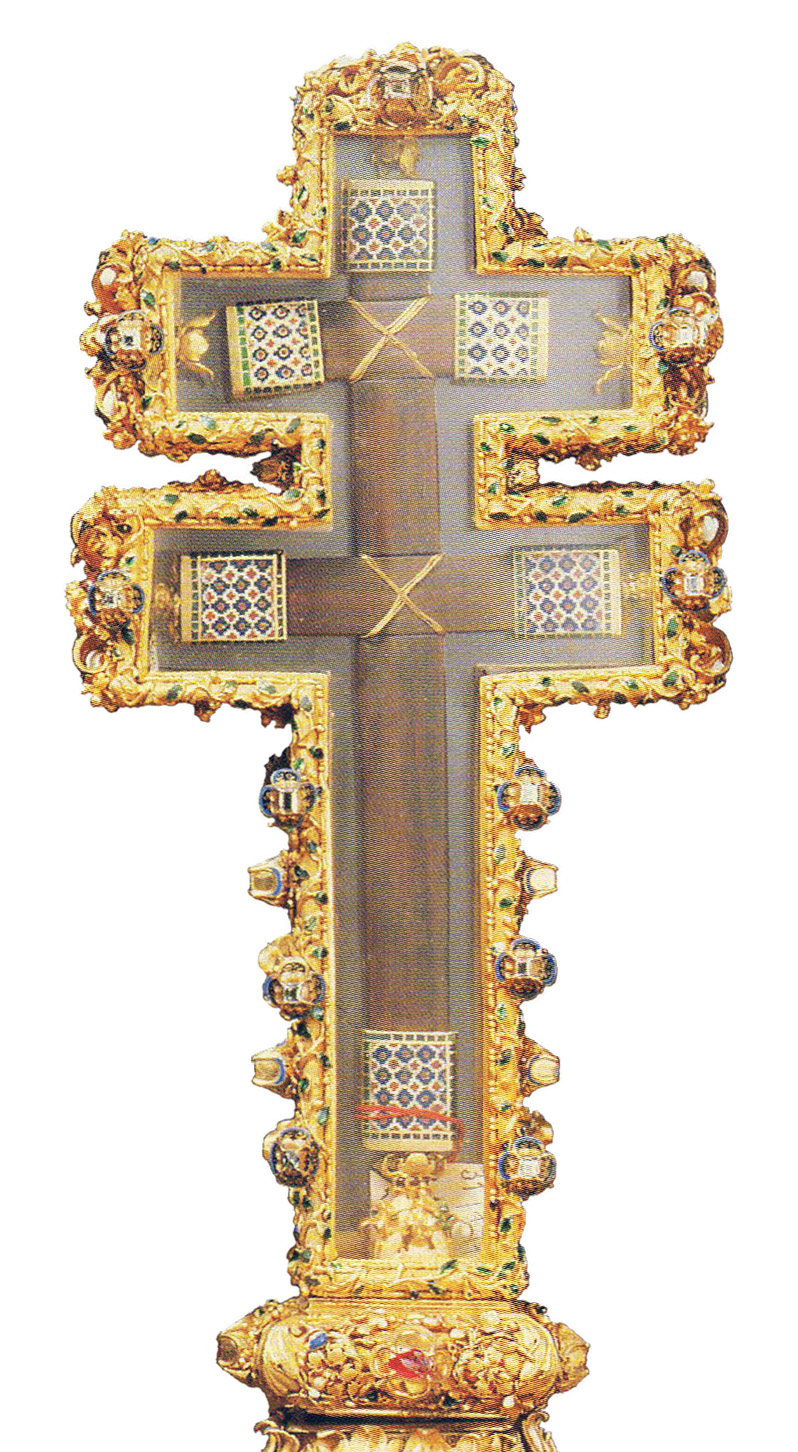
The reliquary of Giovanni Maria Mondella.

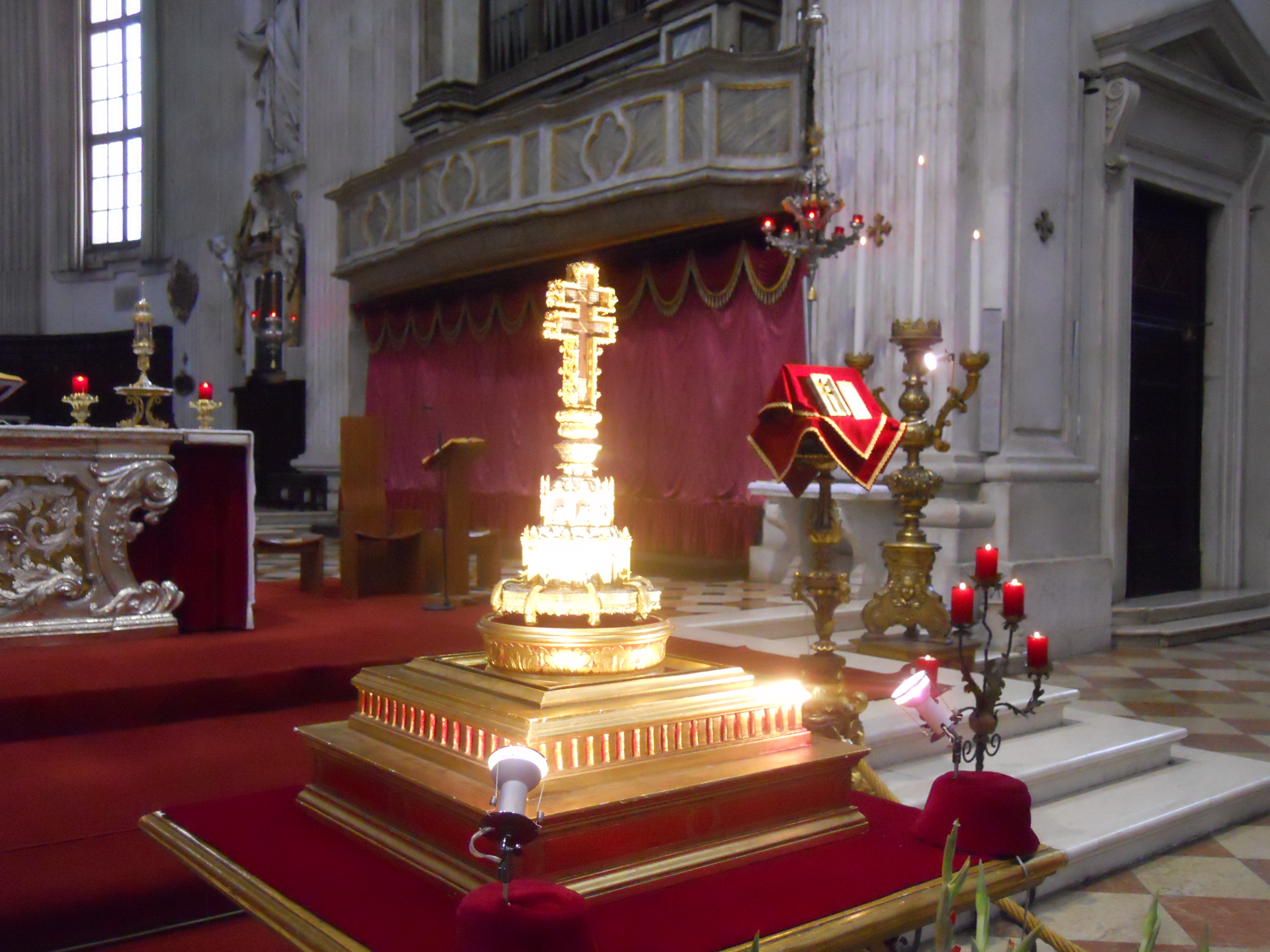
The reliquary displayed in the New Cathedral.

=== The Cross of the Field ===
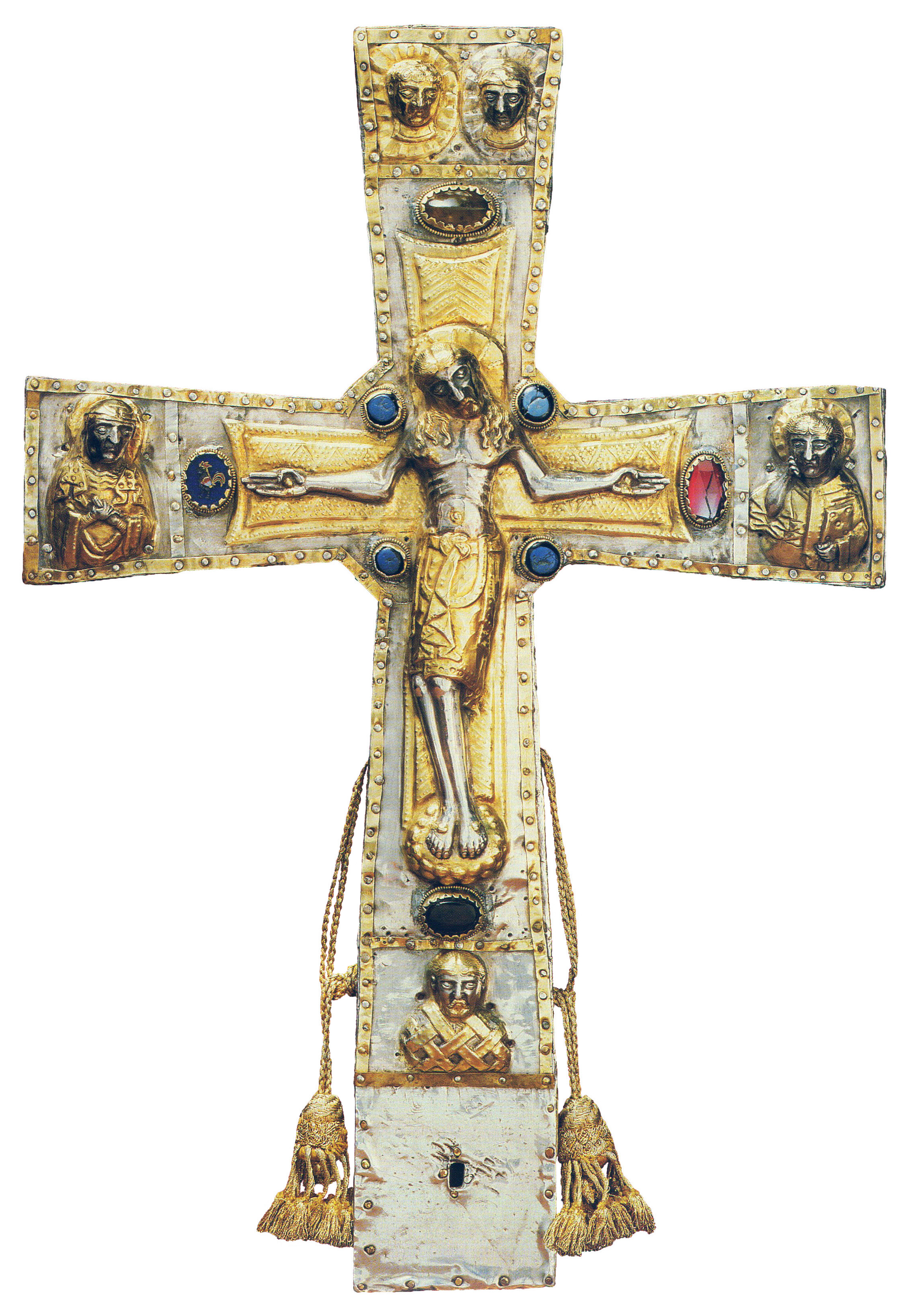
The Cross of the Field (front).

==== Description ====
The Cross of the Field, also known as the Cross of the Oriflamme, is a Greek cross with arms slightly expanded at the ends, with an extension on the lower arm making it a Latin cross. It is 42 centimeters high, 28.5 centimeters wide and 5 centimeters thick, consisting of a walnut wood core entirely covered with pure silver foil with gilded silver edges attached by pegs. On one side the arms are connected by a disk, on the other by short diagonal strokes. The whole is adorned with set gems and figures worked in high relief in the silver foil.

On the front is the relief figure of Jesus, affixed to a cross of lesser embossment covered with a unitary, burin motif of dots and laths. The head is recumbent, the arms slightly bent, the legs parallel, and the feet nailed separately on a circular footrest. At the sides is knotted a long cloth. At the four ends of the arms are, also strongly embossed, the other key figures in the Crucifixion of Jesus, similarly to the staurotheke: Mary on the left, St. John on the right with the book of the Gospels at his chest, and the Sun and Moon at the top, in this case personified in two faces among which, consistently, only the first is gilded. At the bottom is placed Adam shrouded in bandages.

On the back of the cross, the four arms converge in a central roundel, also edged in gold, where is placed the Agnus Dei, worked with strong embossing. The animal holds a cross that repeats the shape of the Field Cross itself, while the head is surrounded by a halo, all in accordance with traditional symbolism. No other reliefs are present on this side. The Cross is fixed on a silver-covered wooden base, hollow on the inside, where the top of a pole was strung and then, once secured with an iron passed between the two central holes, erected on the chariot. From the sides hang two cords with tassels that, according to Andrea Valentini, were added in 1837.

==== Style ====
The dating of the Cross of the Field has been a topic of wide discussion throughout the nineteenth century and much of the twentieth century. Early nineteenth-century commentators (Giuseppe Brunati, Alessandro Sala, Federico Odorici and others) assigned the cross to a Lombard goldsmith of the late twelfth or early thirteenth century. Adolfo Venturi, in 1904, similarly said it was the work of northern Italian goldsmiths of the 12th century. Paolo Guerrini, in 1924, returned to nineteenth-century proposals, while starting with Antonio Morassi's 1939 commentary, critics settled on the shared conclusion that the cross is a Lombard work of the twelfth century.

Gaetano Panazza, in 2001, made a comparison with other works of the period, finding compositional similarities with the Cross of Aribert in the treasure of the Milan Cathedral and noting that in the latter "the figure of the Redeemer seems to sink into the cross, due to the weight of the body, with an effect similar to that noted in the Brescian cross." The cross is also a work of the Lombardy School of Fine Arts. Other similarities can be found in the burin motif that covers the crucifix of the Cross of the Field with the same motif in the background of the crucifix of the Cathedral of Vercelli, in the cover of the Evangeliary of Aribert in the treasure of the Cathedral of Milan, or in that of the Evangeliary of Matilda of Canossa, in the Morgan Library in New York, or in the Peace of Chiavenna. The scholar concludes by considering the Cross of the Field a work of Lombard goldsmithing from the late 11th or early 12th century.

==== Scheme of the gems ====
1. Yellow glass, gallery stonesetting.; 2. Onyx engraved with wading bird, lacking head because it is fractured, rub-over stonesetting.; 3. Onyx engraved with wading bird, very damaged, rub-over stonesetting.; 4. Engraved onyx, illegible, rub-over stonesetting.; 5. Onyx engraved with wading bird, fairly preserved, rub-over stonesetting.; 6. Lapis lazuli ageminated in gold with red and white enamels depicting a rooster, gallery stonesetting.; 7. Smooth dark yellow glass, gallery stonesetting.; 8. Reddish glass, not original, gallery stonesetting.

1. Agate, rub-over stonesetting.; 2. Carnelian, rub-over stonesetting.; 3. Clear amethyst, rub-over stonesetting. This is a halved orb with passage hole for a necklace wire or other. According to Andrea Valentini it is an 1837 addition.; 4. Green glass, gallery stonesetting.; 5. Carnelian sanguine, rub-over stonesetting.; 6. Engraved carnelian from the Roman period, 1st-3rd century, rub-over stonesetting. Depicted here, in discreet workmanship, is a crowned man wearing a cloak and short breeches, leaning on a staff with a dog in front of him, standing upright on his hind legs.; 7. Topaz-colored glass, rub-over stonesetting.; 8. Carnelian, gallery stonesetting.; 9. Engraved onyx from Roman times, 1st-3rd century, rub-over stonesetting. It depicts a winged victory, very similar to the one from Brescia but holding a twisted rod with a disk at the upper end, where the inscription "IVV.Q" reads.; 10. Amazonite, rub-over stonesetting.; 11. Amazonite, rub-over stonesetting.; 12. Agate, rub-over stonesetting.; 13. Green glass, gallery stonesetting.; 14. Pink glass, rub-over stonesetting.; 15. Carnelian engraved with seahorse, rub-over stonesetting.; 16. Green glass, rub-over stonesetting.; 17. Amethyst-colored glass, gallery stonesetting.; 18. Carnelian, rub-over stonesetting.; 19. Striped onyx with two opposing engraved curls, rub-over stonesetting.; 20. Carnelian, rub-over stonesetting.; 21. Carnelian, rub-over stonesetting.

==== Other images ====
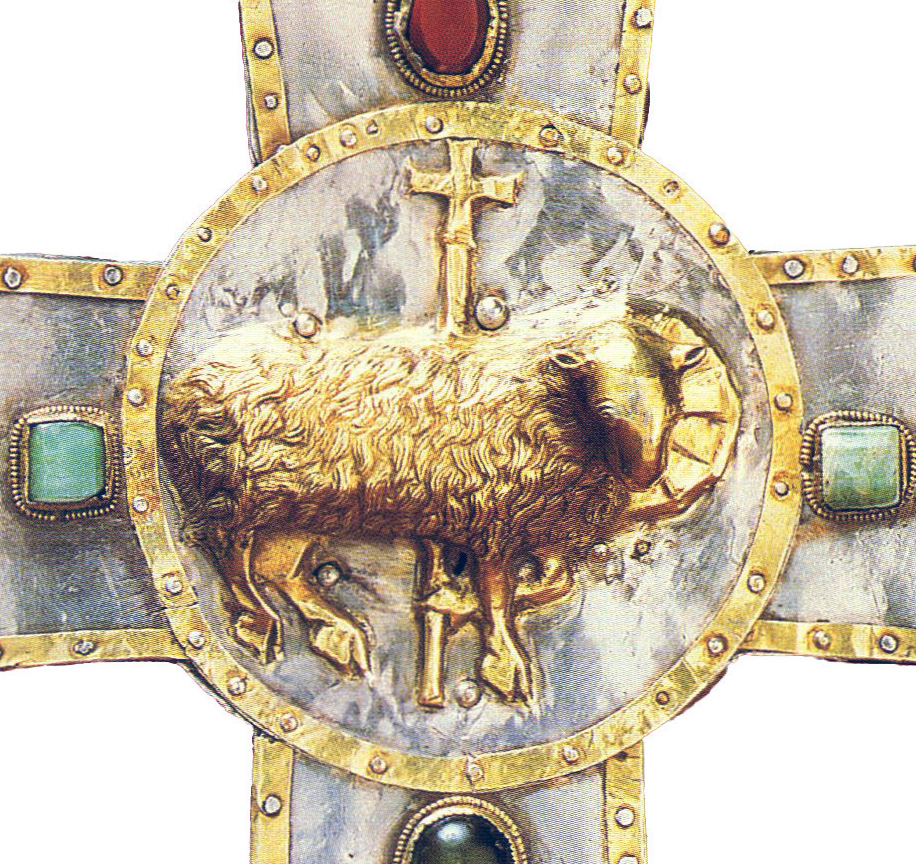
Detail of the Agnus Dei.

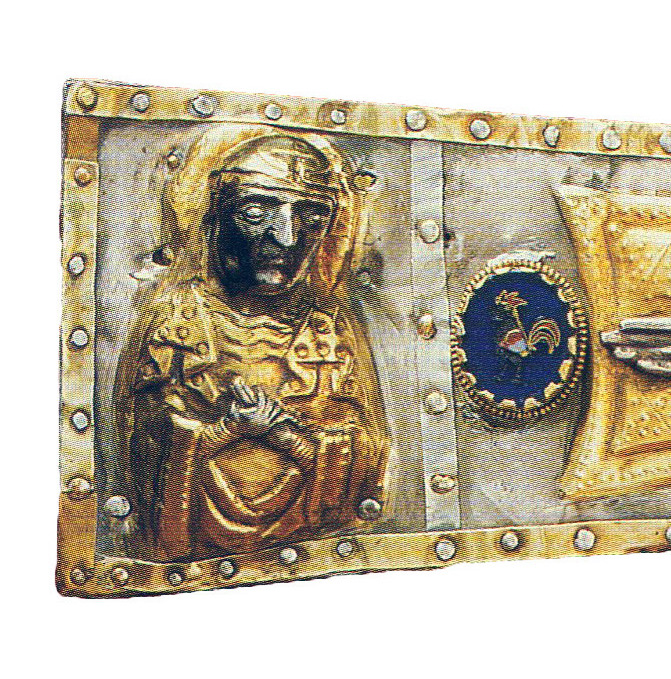
Detail of Mary.

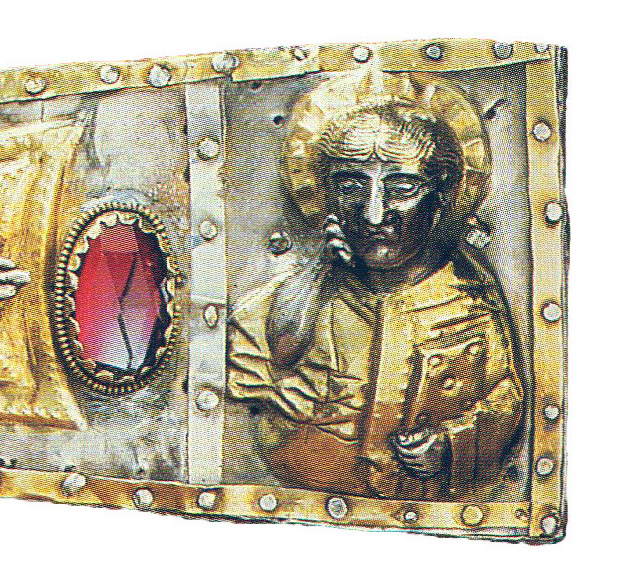
Detail of St. John the Baptist.

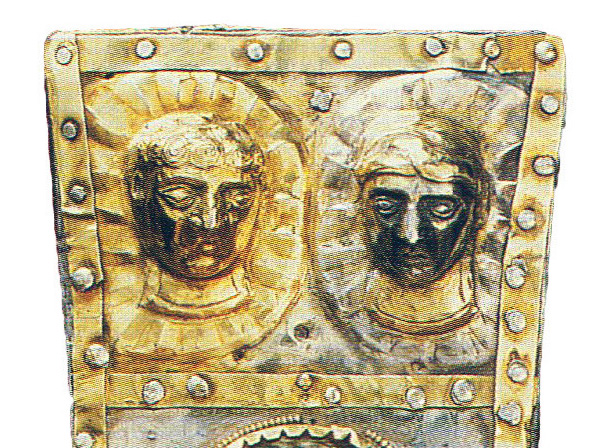
Detail of the Sun and Moon.

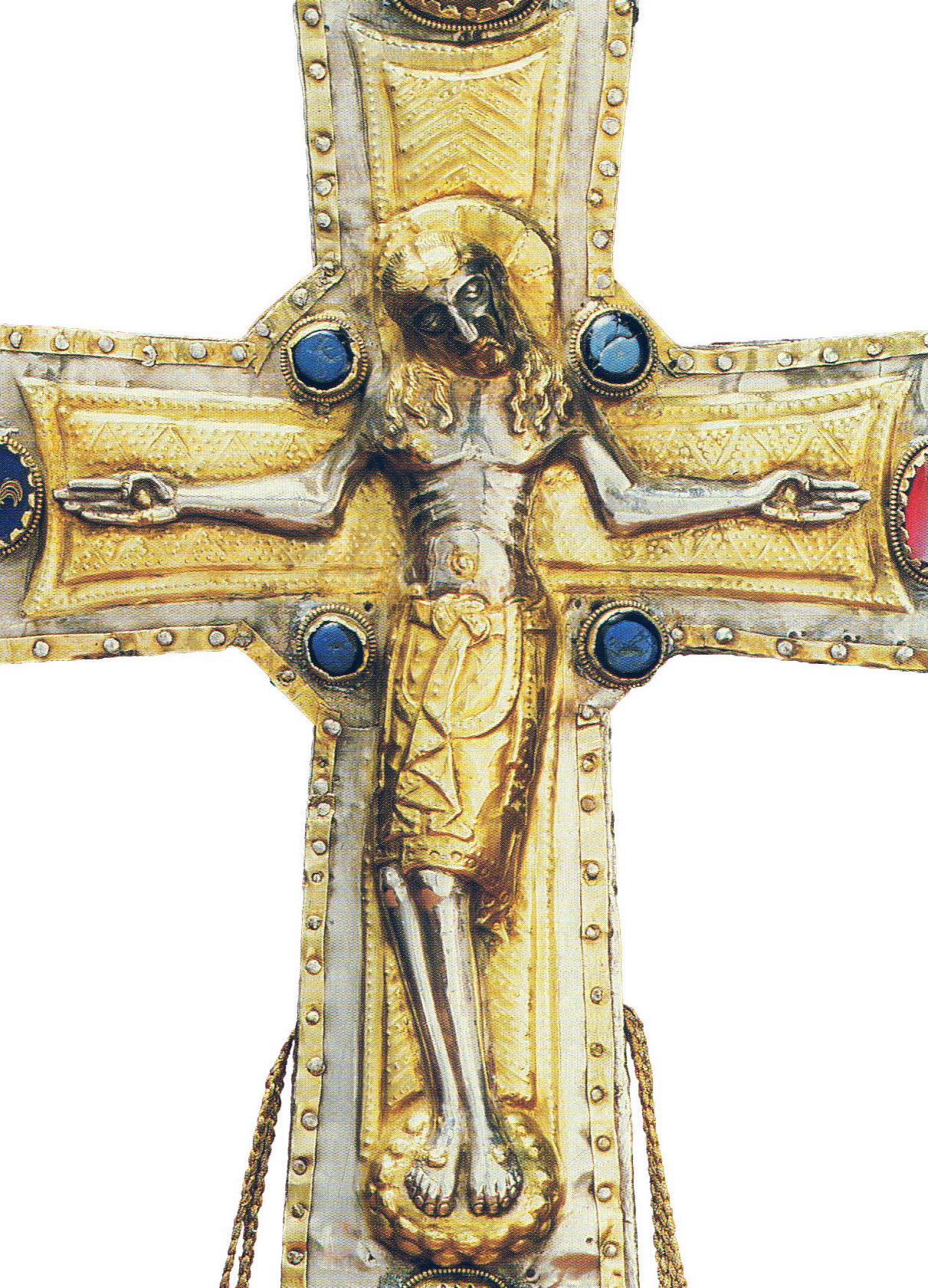
Detail of Jesus crucified.

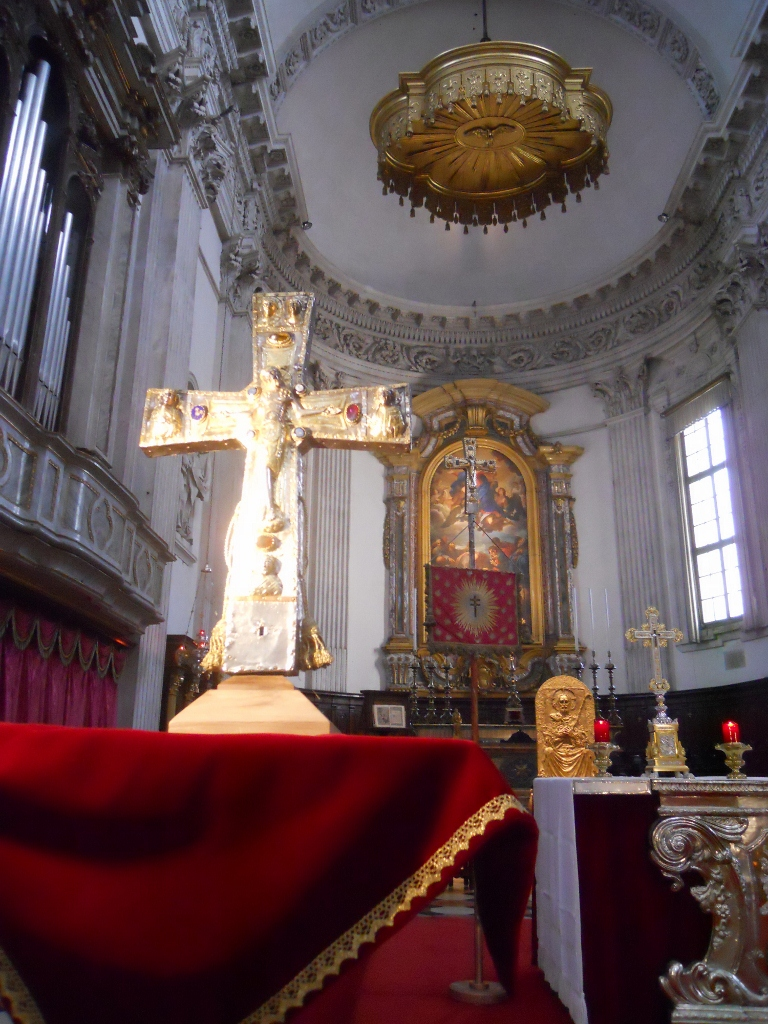
The Field Cross displayed in the New Cathedral.

=== The chest ===
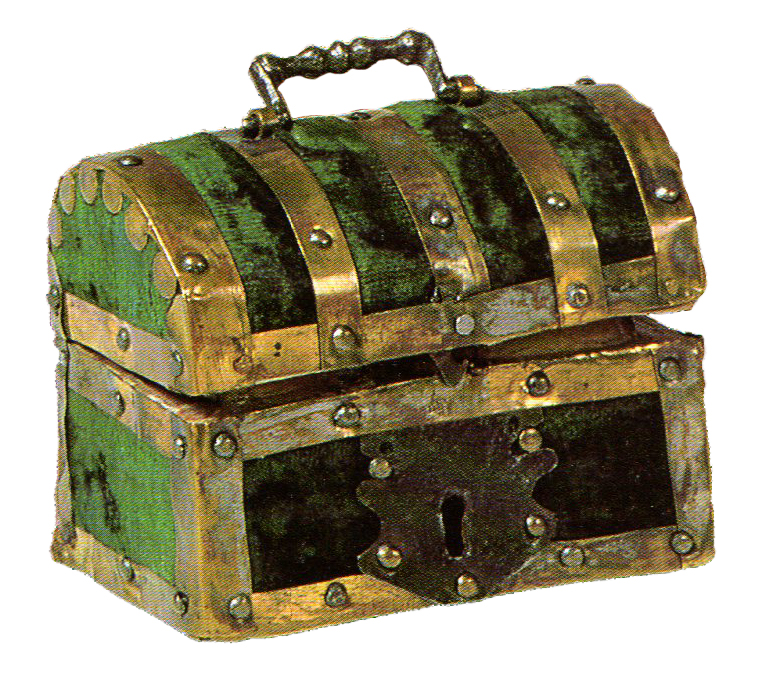
The chest

It is an artifact of secondary importance within the treasury, in which only a silver-leafed vine from the Reliquary is kept today. It also held a coin of Honorius and a votive medal, which have been lost. The case is rectangular and measures only 6 x 4.5 centimeters by 5.5 centimeters in height. It is a modest work from the first half of the fifteenth century.

The chest is made entirely of ordinary wood covered with green velvet, which in turn is banded with vertical and horizontal strips of a metal alloy of gold, silver, and copper. The lid, which can be flipped over, has a semi-cylindrical section and features an elegant handle in the center, while a shaped metal plate for the lock is placed on the front of the chest. The interior lining is rose-colored paper, watermarked with stripes.

A small red velvet purse with gold embroidery made in the second half of the sixteenth century by Bishop Gianfrancesco Morosini to hold the coin and medal mentioned earlier is preserved in the chest. Beneath the purse is a small silver box with a lid, simple and plain, containing the screw that closed the top of Bernardino delle Croci's pedestal once the Illustrious Relic had been removed, before Mondella's reliquary was affixed.

=== The Reliquary of the Holy Thorns ===
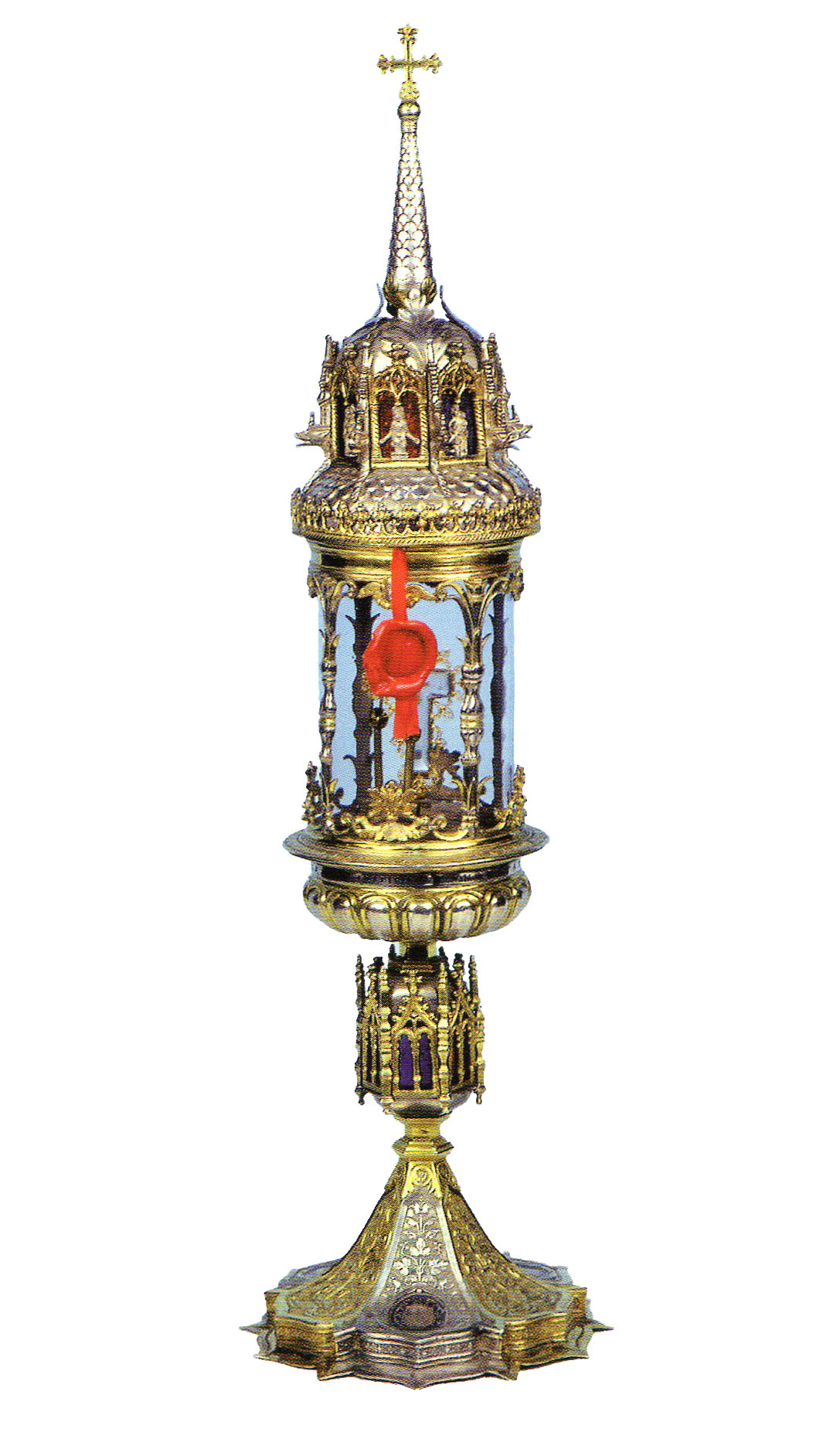
The reliquary of the Holy Thorns.

Commissioned in the early 16th century by the nuns of the Santa Giulia monastery to store two thorns believed to have come from Jesus' crown of thorns, it remained in the monastery's treasury until its suppression in 1797 at the hands of the Brescian Republic.

Taken away from the nuns, the reliquary was transferred to the treasury of the Holy Crosses, adding to the traditional components. Later, its contents were enriched: Bishop Girolamo Verzeri, during his episcopate, donated and had a third thorn added to the shrine, while Giacinto Gaggia, in 1933, inserted a small crystal cross containing a supposed fragment of the True Cross.

It is a valuable work from the early 16th century, made by Brescian manufactory in the workshop of the Delle Croci.

=== Bishop Zane's Cross ===
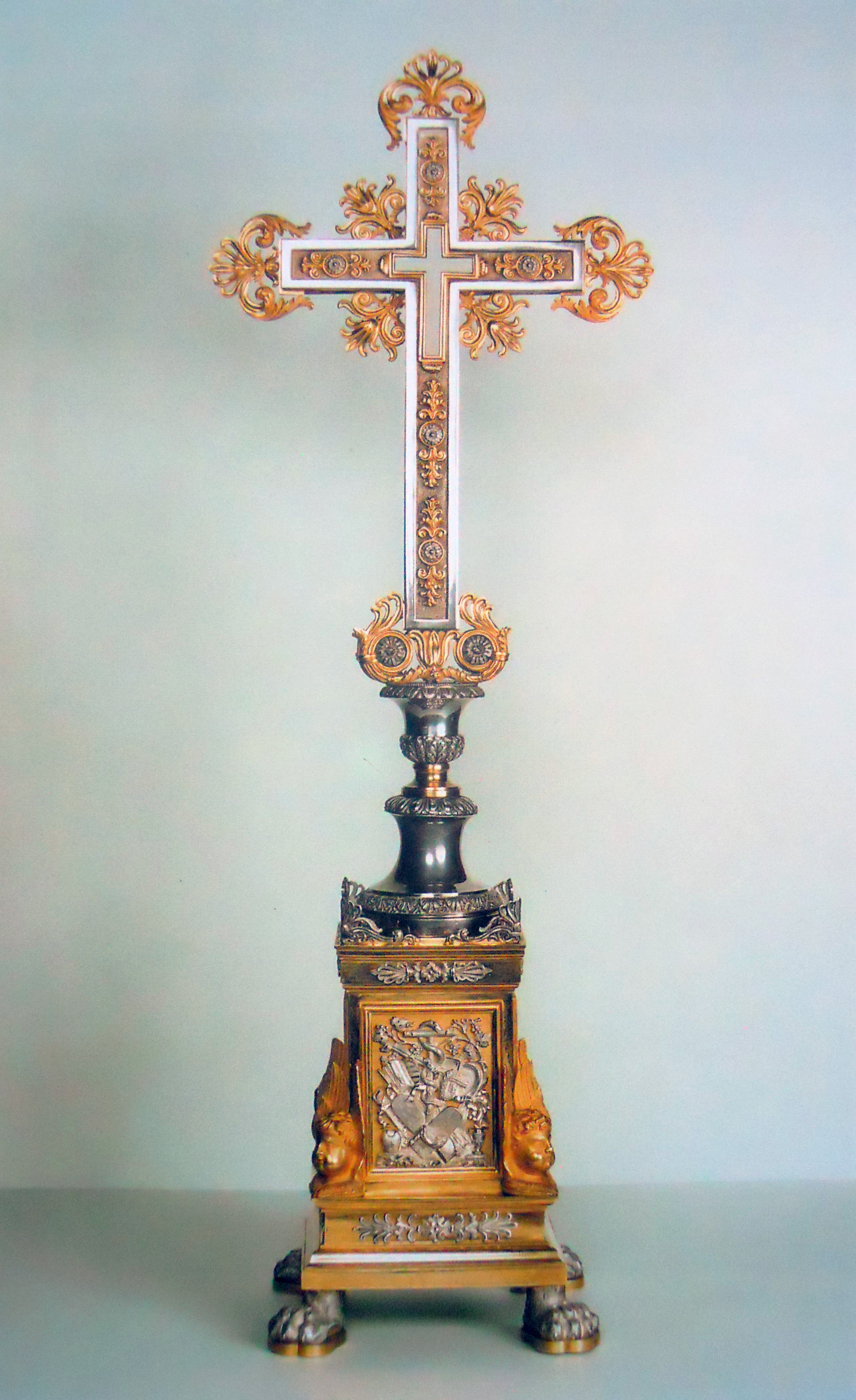
Bishop Zane's reliquary of the Cross.

The cross was made in 1841 by Brescian goldsmith Antonio Pedrina and has been a permanent part of the treasure of the Holy Crosses ever since. The reliquary contains the little cross donated to the Brescian community by Bishop Paolo Zane in 1531, the custody of which predates Pedrina's. The work represents a fine example of mid-nineteenth-century Brescian neoclassical goldsmithing, whose greatest artistic relief is concentrated in the intricate relief of the pedestal.

== Lost items ==
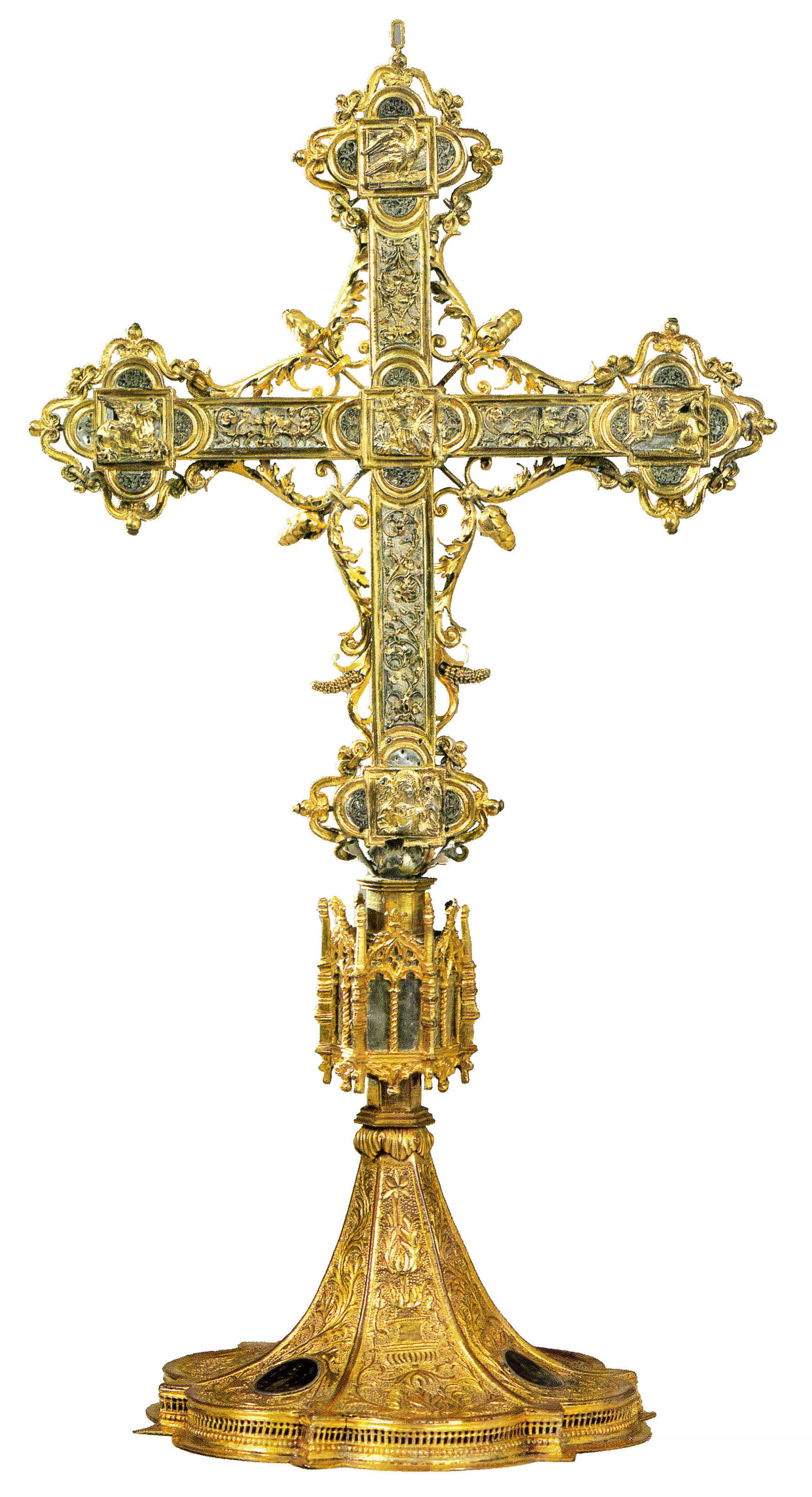
St. Faustinus' Cross. The piece left the treasury in 1828.

The treasure, during the twentieth century, saw the loss of five secondary pieces that were kept with it, likely stolen and never again found or returned.

Lost in 1917 were the three silver-plated wooden sticks that, mounted together, made up the pole of the Field Cross: the November 1, 1917 minutes of the Company of Custodians, which on that day extraordinarily opened the treasure to hide it and secure it from the war, recorded their absence, meaning that they were left out after the last display, which took place on April 22 of that year.

The other two pieces were a gold coin minted during the reign of Emperor Honorius and a copper medal. The coin had been given to Bishop Gianfrancesco Morosini by Sixtus V, who had recovered it, along with many others later distributed to various dioceses, during the reconstruction of the Lateran Palace. The medal, on the other hand, was of a votive character but neither the appearance nor the time of manufacture have come down to us, having in fact never come under the interest of scholars.

The two objects, kept in the velvet purse described earlier, were lost during studies of the Field Cross conducted in 1951. Their actual disappearance would not be noticed until five years later, on November 16, 1956, on the occasion of the first exhibition carried out at the end of the studies.

Also lost, relocated or no longer traceable are the various reliquaries and other liturgical objects, such as ciboria, tabernacles and small chests, mentioned in the inventory of the contents of a cabinet in the chapel compiled by Benettino Calino in 1623.

The Cross of St. Faustinus, which became part of the treasury in 1797 along with the reliquary of the Holy Thorns and was ceded in 1828 to the Church of Saints Faustinus and Jovita with the relic contained therein, can also be considered "lost," but actually only transferred. The artifact, from that day owned by the parish of Saints Faustinus and Jovita, is no longer part of the treasure of the Holy Crosses.

=== The banner of the Oriflamme ===
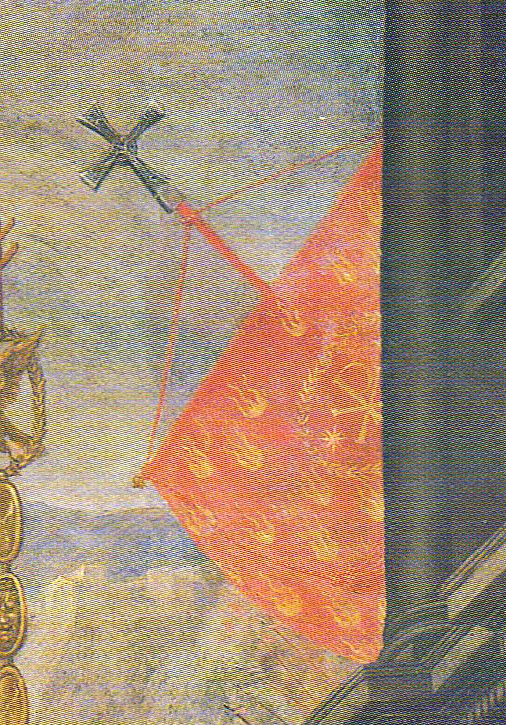
Grazio Cossali's version of the Oriflamme.

More complex is the history of the banner of the Oriflamme, the municipal banner that was hoisted on the carriage below the Cross of the Field. A first mention was reported towards the end of the 14th century by the apothecary Leoncino Ceresolo, who attested to having seen de visu, at a public exhibition, the Oriflamme which was the color of fire, but worn out because of its antiquity. He added there how around 1400 the banner, though still in existence, was no longer shown to the people.

The artifact is mentioned only twice, but very clearly, in documentary sources: it is first mentioned in an accurate description of the main components of the treasure compiled in 1663 by Lodovico Baitelli, who also mentions a fanciful but erroneous story derived from mistaken beliefs about the origin of the Illustrious Relic. Speaking of the two holes at the base of the Cross of the Field, the scholar writes:

It also has in the sides some piercing holes, to perhaps strengthen with competent chains the Cross to the pole, to make it safer from falling: or to attach the end of the traverse, from which hung the very famous Imperial Vessel woven richly with gold flames, and enriched with precious things, called by Romans Labarum, which Charlemagne, who wanted the divine sign of the Cross above all military Insignia, made himself preceded by being decorated with that most precious Cross, which passed to his hands, fabricated by the Great Constantine.
This Banner dazzling with its splendors the eyes of the militia, was therefore called Oriflamme. And therefore the Cross called the Field Cross, which above its pole stood affixed, with reason, drew the name of the Oriflamme Cross [...]. Of this most glorious standard [... ] we will say that we have seen it in the Opening of the Ark of the Protector Saints, which was made by order of the Public in the Year 1623 with our own eyes as Deputies to the Ark itself, but rather shattered, and consumed, while it was of silk, and gold: for in it was wrapped the earth, which was wet with the blood that sprung (at the sight of the Lord Naimon) from the parched bones of our Most Holy Protectors, which was placed over the feet of them; and there were seen rows of gold scattered, and the ornaments that enriched it, as pearls, gold buttons, silver marquets, and similar precious things.

— Lodovico Baitelli, Brief History of the Most Holy Crosses, 1663, pp. 16-27.

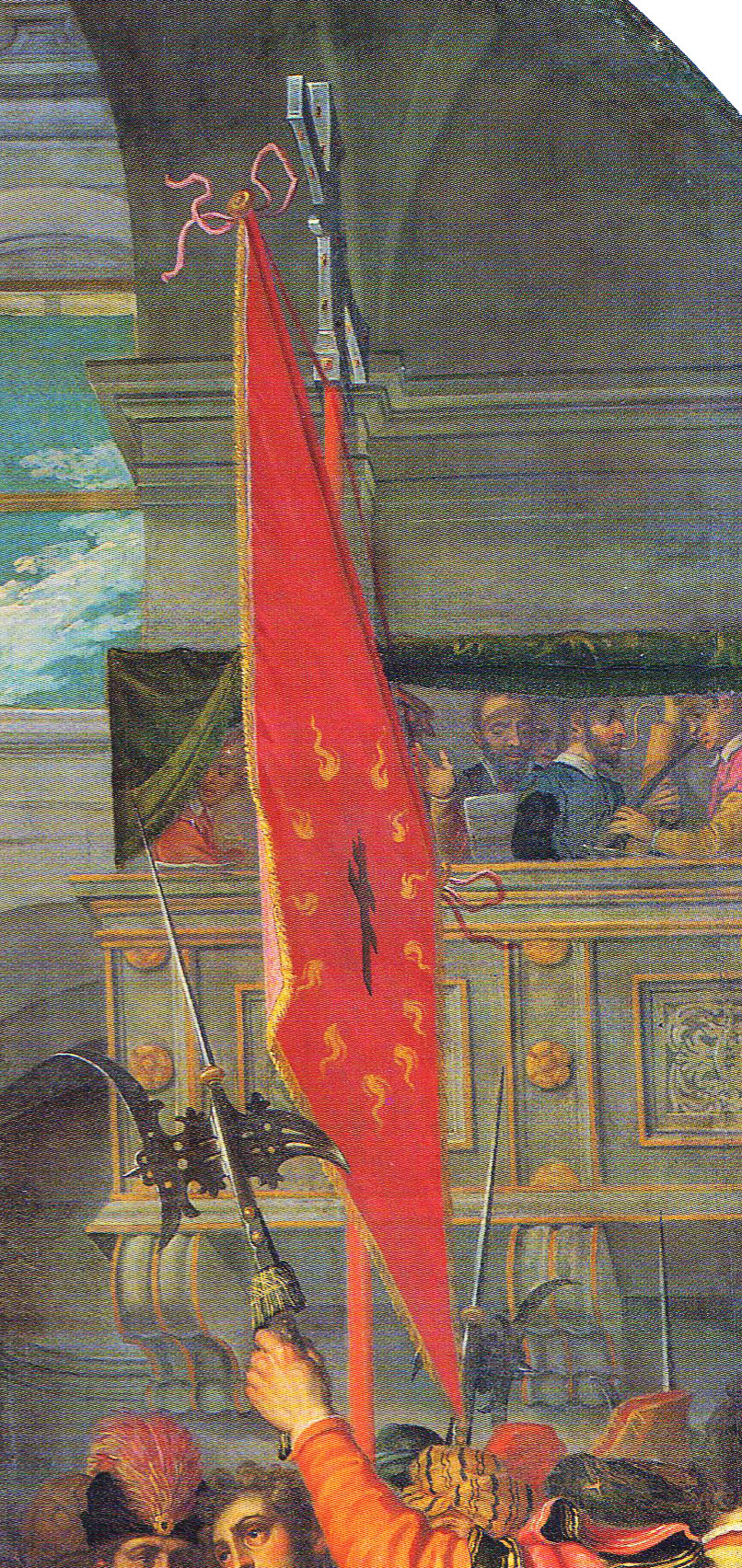
Antonio Gandino's version of the Orifiamma.

From Baitelli's invaluable testimony, several pieces of information are derived. First of all, it is deduced that the banner was not physically part of the treasure of the Holy Crosses, but was kept in the primitive ark of Saints Faustinus and Jovita and, since it enveloped the earth bathed in the blood of the patron saints exuded during the well-known 9th-century miracle, it was more related to the cult of the two patron saints than to that of the Illustrious Relic. The fanciful origins of the banner to which Baitelli alludes are linked to the legendary tale that developed over the centuries as an "extension" of the Naimon episode: according to that legend, the Brescian Oriflamme was the labarum made to be woven by Constantine I in person after the vision In hoc signo vinces at the battle of the Milvian Bridge, handed down to Constantine IV, then given to Charlemagne, by him delivered to Naimon of Bavaria and, finally, given to Brescia. Also present at the opening of the ark conducted in 1623 was historian Ottavio Rossi, who wrote the official report of the ceremony. What is reported in his paper seems to completely support Baitelli's note:

There lies over their [the two patrons'] feet, and over part of their legs, a very raised banner, which shows it to have been a cloth of some size, broken down throughout by antiquity. It seems to be the banner of the Oriflamme. And united with this banner much of that earth, which was bathed by that blood which miraculously flowed from them while they were transporting themselves from the Cemetery of St. Latin.

— Ottavio Rossi, Relatione dell'Aprimento dell'Arca de' Santissimi Protomartiri, et Patroni della Città di Brescia, Faustino, et Giovita, 1623.

The bodies of the two patron saints were transferred to the new monumental ark in that same year, and it is probably on this occasion that the banner was lost. Conversely, given the reverence shown for it and the very fact that it contained the miraculous soil, it seems unlikely that at the time the relics were moved, the Oriflamme and its contents were simply disposed of. The loss of the banner, in this case, should be ascribed to later events, of which nothing is known. Andrea Valentini, in 1882, believed that the Oriflamme could still be found in 1764 and that the copy made then on behalf of Bernardino Martinengo was a faithful reproduction of the original, lost only later. However, this is purely Valentini's supposition and impossible to confirm.

As for the appearance of the banner, its oldest known depictions are contained in the two large canvases in the Chapel of the Holy Crosses in the Old Cathedral. The two paintings are contemporary (1605-1606), but they offer mutually different versions of the banner.

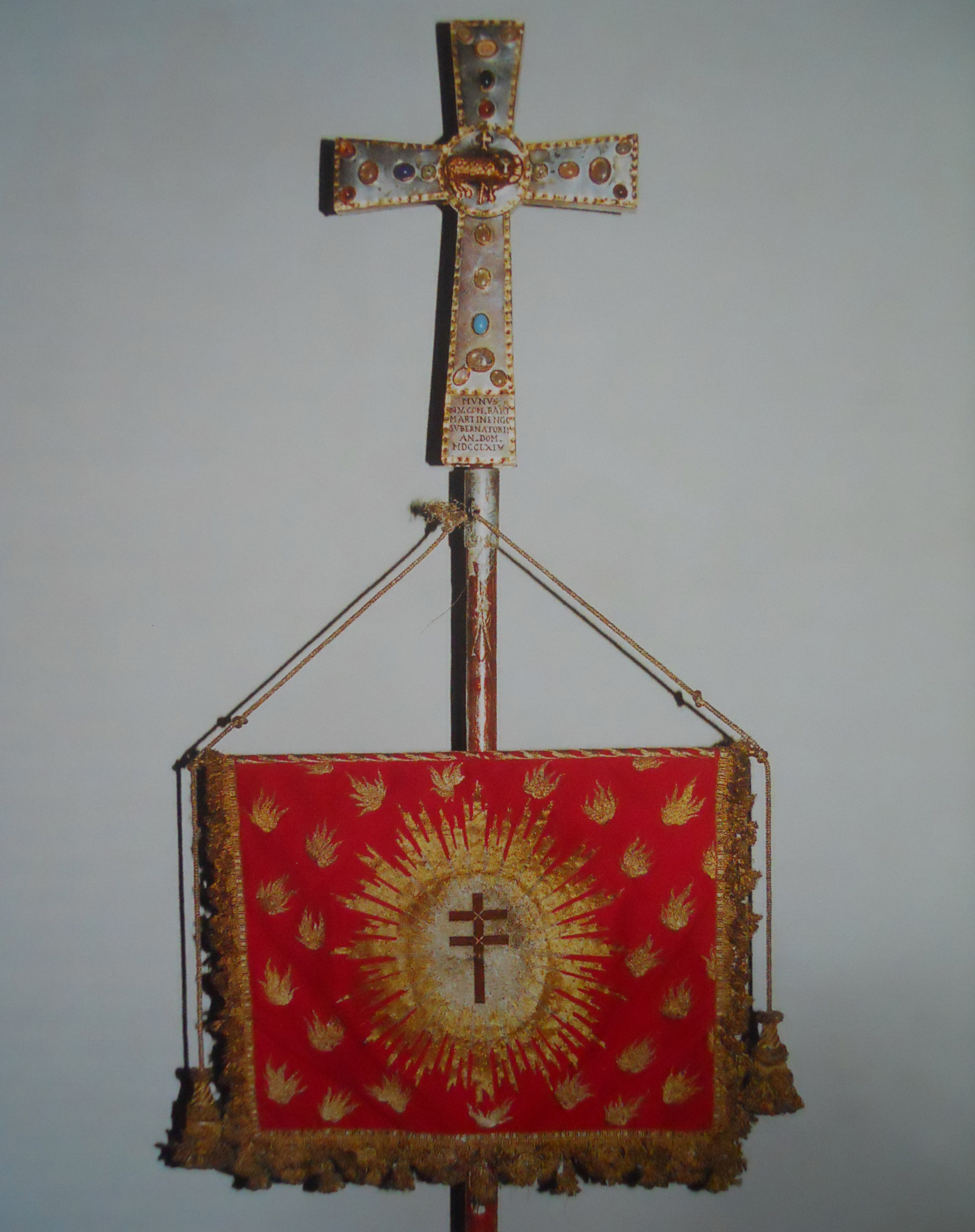
The Oriflamme and the copy of the Field Cross executed in 1764.

In Grazio Cossali's 'Apparition of the Cross to Constantine,' it is seen emerging from the back of a building, hanging from a pole at the top of which is fixed the Field Cross. The banner, especially in proportion to the latter, appears very large and red in color, with the monogram of Christ in the center surrounded by a laurel wreath, while around it are embroidered numerous golden flames, hence the name. The reproduction of the banner proposed in the Donation of Naimon of Bavaria, by Antonio Gandino, shows it still red in color and hanging from a pole with the Cross of the Field on top, but in proportion to the latter it is smaller and, above all, the decoration is different: in the center is a reproduction of the Illustrious Relic, a double cross, while the golden flames are smaller and neatly arranged to form a circle around the cross. There is a third and final historical reproduction of the artifact, namely the copy made by Bartolomeo Martinengo in 1764, mentioned earlier, which seems to take up both versions by Cossali and Gandino. From the former it seems to draw the red background camped with golden flames, while from the latter the reproduction of the Illustrious Relic in the center, surrounded, however, by a rayed sun.

The profound iconographic difference found in the two versions by Cossali and Gandino, which are contemporary, can perhaps be used as an indication of how difficult the banner, even then, was to reconstruct in its original appearance. From Baitelli's and Rossi's accounts comes the image of a filthy, worn banner, "broken down in everything from antiquity" and used to bind up some earth, with "scattered rows of gold" just as scattered must have been "the ornaments that enriched it." It is not a banner with clear decorations, not even a definite size, although Rossi indicates it as "a banner of somewhat large size" kept in its coiled position around the earth, not unrollable. The different versions of Cossali and Gandino thus appear legitimate, since they are reproductions of something now completely indefinable.

However, if one wishes to give a literal interpretation to Baitelli's statement that the banner was "richly woven with golden flames," then the version most faithful to the original would seem to be the one proposed by Grazio Cossali in his painting, where the red fabric is entirely covered with golden flames. If Cossali's reproduction really corresponds to reality, though, then it means that the painter conceived it on the basis of other sources or reproductions of the banner, since by the time the ark was opened in 1623 (and the subsequent testimony of Rossi and Baitelli) the banner had already been painted for more than fifteen years.

== Custody of the treasure ==
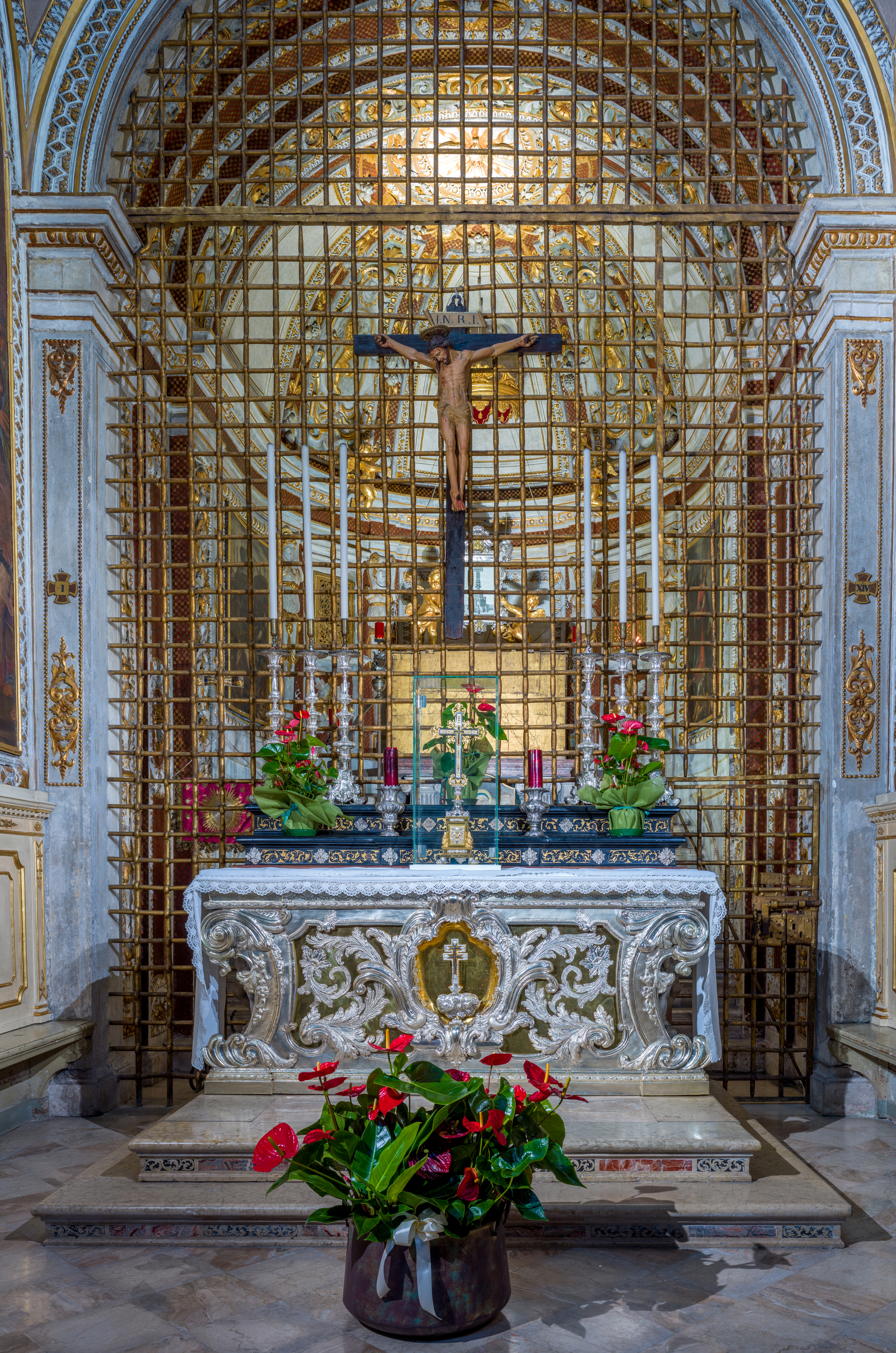
The Chapel of the Holy Crosses. Note the altar by Carlo Carra, the thick grating from 1500, and, at the back, the gilded chest.

The treasure of the Holy Crosses, of very high historical and economic value, is protected by two main levels of security. The first barrier is represented by the Chapel of the Holy Crosses itself where it is kept, access to which is protected by a thick golden grating dating back to the 1500s, flanked in the late 20th century by a laser anti-theft device. Inside the chapel, the treasure has been kept since 1935 inside a modern safe, replacing the original iron chest where it was formerly stored. The ancient chest is still preserved in the chapel.

=== The Chapel of the Holy Crosses ===
Built from September 25, 1495, with subsidization from the city council, the Chapel of the Holy Crosses is where the treasure is kept inside the Old Cathedral, in the north transept. The project, entrusted to Bernardino da Martinengo, a master mason already at work in the cathedral for the erection of the new choir, was immediately materialized, and by the early sixteenth century the treasure could be transferred from the sacristy, where it was kept, to the new chapel built for the purpose.

After a primitive decorative cycle due to Floriano Ferramola, the chapel underwent its first stylistic updates in the second half of the sixteenth century at the hands of Giovanni Maria Piantavigna, although it is unclear to what extent. On the other hand, the radical Baroque revision of the chapel was carried out between the end of the century and the first half of the seventeenth century, enriching the small room with stuccoes by Andrea Colomba, in collaboration with his son Giovanni Antonio, completed by Francesco Giugno's paintings and, above all, by the two large canvases by Antonio Gandino and Grazio Cossali, mentioned earlier. Almost contemporary is the general overhaul of the marble decorations, with Carlo Carra being entrusted with the new altar and other stoneworkers with some minor works, such as the resurfacing of the floor. The execution and placement of Moretto's Christ and the Angel as the chapel's new altarpiece can be dated to 1550. Between the end of the seventeenth century and the nineteenth century, the chapel's building activity can be said to have ended, which, on the other hand, saw the liturgical silverware patrimony increase with the arrival of many valuable pieces, including the large central lamp by goldsmith Giuseppe Lugo, placed in 1696.

==== The chest and the safe ====
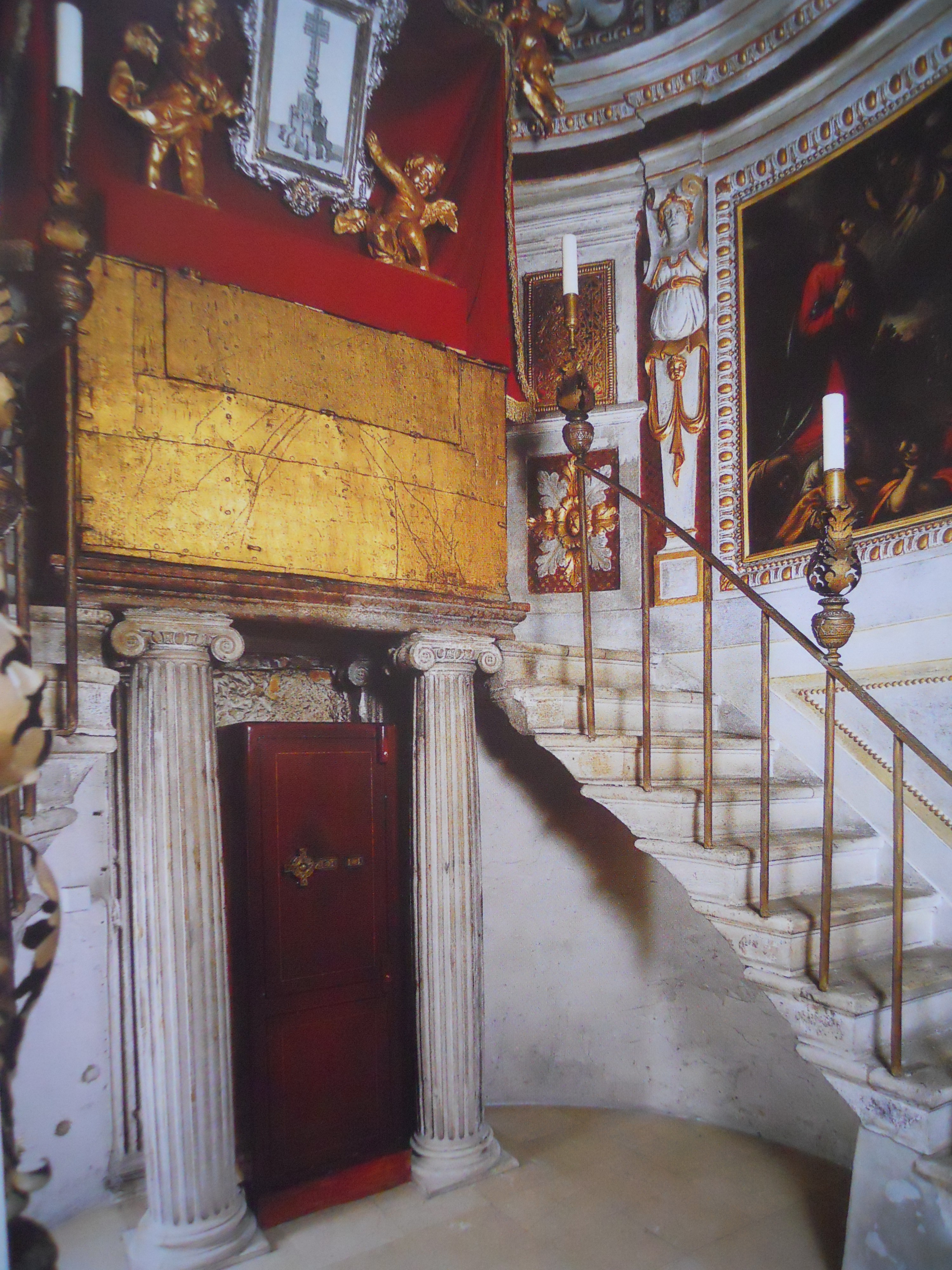
Interior of the Chapel of the Holy Crosses: the new safe placed in 1935 is visible under the old gilded iron chest.

The oldest archival document referring to the treasury, dating from the mid-13th century and already discussed, also contains the earliest mention of a "sacrarum," a trunk or chest, openable by means of numerous keys, in which the treasure was kept. It has come down to us, replaced in its functions only in 1931, a large gilded iron chest with a complex opening system, inside which, in earlier centuries, the treasure was stored and kept.

It is not possible to confirm that such a chest is the original "sacrarum," partly because of the various overhauls of the security system it has undergone over the centuries, but the overall workmanship can indeed be dated to the Middle Ages and it is therefore likely that it is the first and only chest ever made for treasure storage. The large chest, and consequently the treasure, were originally kept in the sacristy of the old cathedral: a document from 1423 clearly mentions the treasure "in ferrata Capsa in sacristia de Dom." It remained there until February 5, 1501, when it was transferred to the chapel of the Holy Crosses that was being completed. In the following centuries, the chest underwent some adjustments to its position within the chapel, particularly after the seventeenth-century reconstruction of the room, finding its final location in an elevated position above two columns of the Ionic order, reached by means of two side ladders.

The holders of the various keys to the chest are listed for the first time in the minutes of a meeting held on May 25, 1295. These were seven keys, three for the chest and four for the bolt, which were distributed among the representatives of the city quadras, then only four: quadra of St. Stephen, St. Alexander, St. John, and St. Faustino. To the first went one key from the casket and one from the bolt, to the second one from the casket, to the third one from the casket and one from the bolt, to the fourth two from the bolt. The second known revision of the entrusting of keys, in order of time, is a municipal provision of 1429, where it was established that the keys, reduced to six, were to be entrusted one to the podestà, one to the chancellor, one to the captain of the people, and one to the bishop or his vicar. The remaining two keys were to be entrusted, from time to time, to two "boni cives" chosen by an abbot and the elders of the people. This was followed by a new municipal provision of August 27, 1445: the document shows that the keys were increased to eight, but equally distributed between personalities of the municipality and the diocese. One key belonged to the commune's lawyer, two to the bishop, one to an archdeacon, two to the podestà, one to another archdeacon, and one to an important lawyer.

Despite these security measures, however, the chest ended up, as time went by, being regularly opened and used by the cathedral chapter: on December 21, 1579, a resolution was passed to renew the keys because books and writings were stored in the chest, degrading the sacred function of guarding the treasury. In the centuries that followed, the keys, which traditionally remained eight, appear to be under ever-changing ownership, or held only on paper and actually guarded by others, usually by figures within the municipality or diocese. Between the 18th and 19th centuries the custody of the keys stabilized with one key entrusted to the bishop and the other seven to the municipality.

The operation of the chest is clearly described in some minutes of the opening of the treasury drawn up between the nineteenth and twentieth centuries. Reported here, among others, is the specific passage taken from the minutes of May 3, 1901:

Having climbed the ladder at the back of the chapel altar, it was found that the locks with which the iron chest secured to the floor and in the wall behind it were closed. [...] Having opened the locks, it was thus possible to lower the flap, which tipped over on the underside and left a strong grating uncovered, freeing the lid. The heavy lid was then lifted and secured to the wall by means of the hooks provided, and a second wooden chest solidly joined on the bottom and closed with two locks on the front was discovered inside the first chest. Introducing his hands into the compartments of the grating, the representative of the municipality with the keys marked with the numbers 7 and 8 opened the aforementioned two locks and lifted and secured the lid of the second crate, it was verified that in it exists a small wooden box covered with red velvet [containing the staurotheke]; in a round case enclosed in a bag of red silk cloth, clasped at the top by a sheath cord a hood covered with red satin [containing the reliquary] and three pieces of silver-plated wood constituting the shaft in which the Field Cross was pivoted [lost].

— Minutes of the opening of the treasure of the Holy Crosses, May 3, 1901.

In 1931, the Company of Custodians deliberated the replacement of the chest with a modern safe, which was purchased and placed where it still stands today, in the small compartment below the large chest, on December 23, 1935. Thus ended the centuries-old tradition of the eight keys, which were reduced to three: one entrusted to the bishop, one to the mayor of the city, and one to the president of the Company of Custodians. The safe, dark red in color, consists of six-centimeter-thick steel walls and is armored, which can be opened by the three separate locks. Inside, it is lined with styrofoam to prevent moisture and infiltration.

The safe includes a second compartment, in the lower half, where the reliquary of the Holy Thorns and Bishop Zane's Cross are kept, which are also usually displayed during other holidays, such as Lent. The compartment, which is the exclusive responsibility of the diocese, is closed by a door with a single lock and the key is kept in the Old Cathedral.

=== The Company of Custodians ===
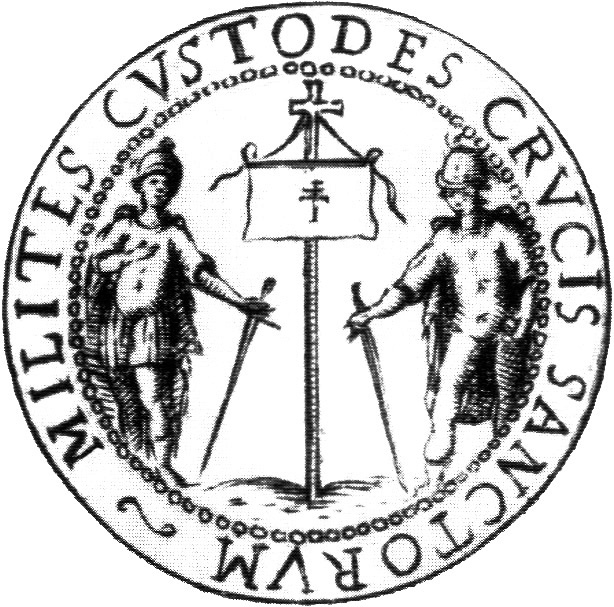
The historic seal of the company. On the border, the inscription Milites Custodes Crucis Sanctorum.

The earliest historical document testifying to the existence of a lay company with the objective of guarding the treasure is a resolution of the municipality of Brescia dated March 3, 1520, in which the council accepted a request made by Mattia Ugoni, bishop of Famagusta and suffragan of the bishop of Brescia Paolo Zane, in which the prelate asked that a grant of one hundred liras be granted for the benefit of a confraternity described as recently established "in honor" of the treasure of the Holy Crosses. Also requested were the commissioning of its own processional standard, to be executed by Moretto, and urgent masonry work in the chapel of the Holy Crosses, which had been completed twenty years earlier.

Over the centuries, the company carried out and supported all the operations of managing, safeguarding, administering and defending the treasure, maintaining its integrity and taking care of its upkeep, as well as the chapel of the Holy Crosses in which it was and still is kept. After the nineteenth-century secularization and the reduction, to the point of disappearance, of most of the activities that made the administration of the confraternity necessary and gave a purpose to its existence (processions, suffragan masses, chapel beautification, purchase and sale of movable property, and so on), the Company of Custodians soon lapsed into a role of pure representation. This does not detract, however, from the fact that any managerial or administrative intervention concerning the treasury and chapel (restoration or maintenance) is still deliberated and supervised by the brethren.

An active role of particular note is the presence of many members of the company during the two annual ordinary exhibitions of the treasury. Secondly, the company promotes and finances publications on the subject and generally participates in major religious events in the city.

== The expositions ==
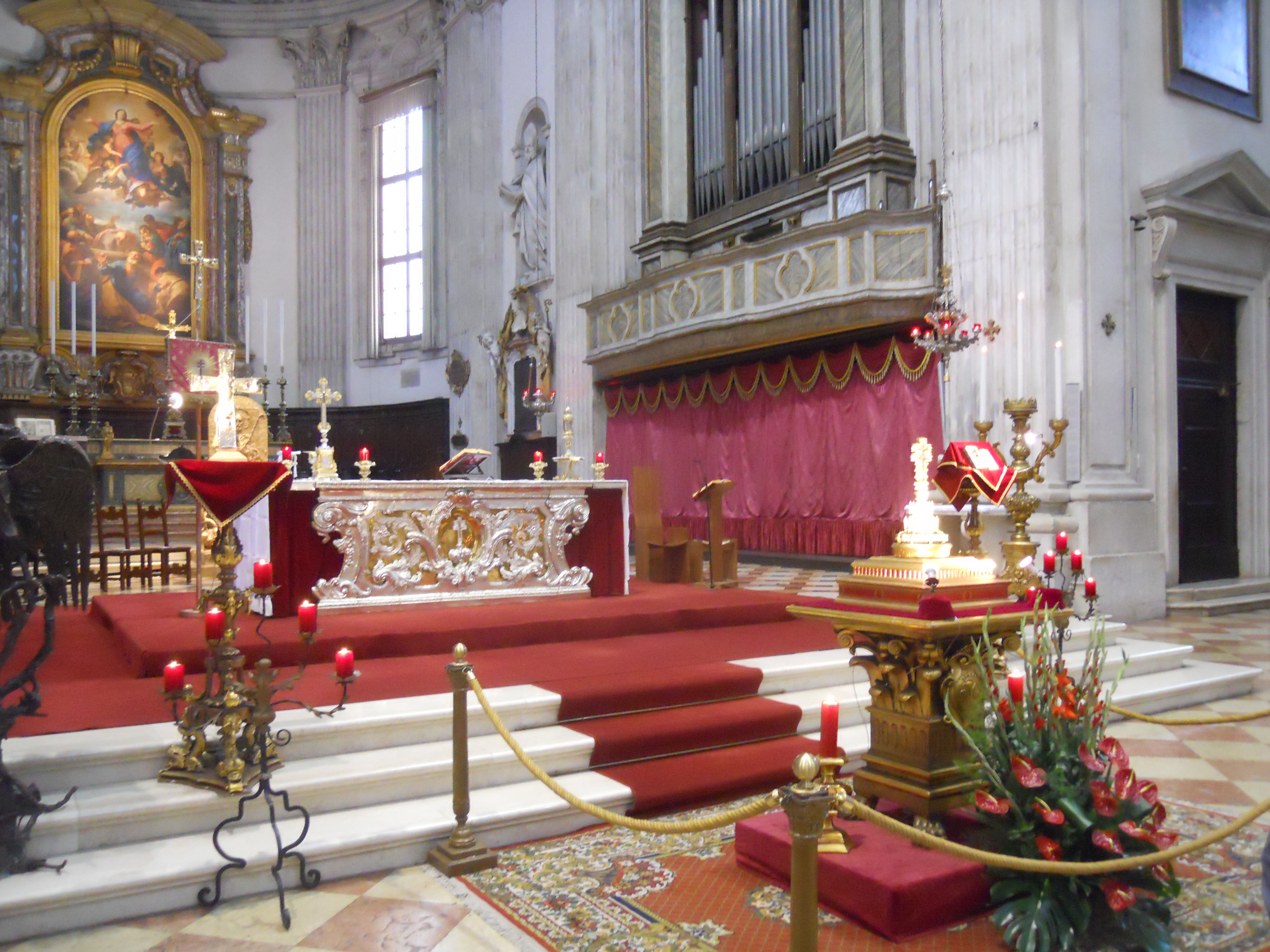
The treasure displayed in the New Cathedral on September 14, 2011. In the foreground, the Cross of the Field and the reliquary of the Holy Cross; in the background, at right, the staurotheke. On the altar, the reliquary of Bishop Zane's Cross and the reliquary of the Holy Thorns.

The treasure of the Holy Crosses is regularly presented to the public in two ordinary annual displays: on September 14, the feast of the Exaltation of the Holy Cross, and on the penultimate Friday of Lent. On these occasions, the treasure is displayed in its entirety in the New Cathedral on pedestals specially placed at the foot of the steps leading to the chancel.

In addition to the ordinary displays, there are usually a number of other extraordinary ones each year, organized on the occasion of important ceremonies or major events in the city's religious life. Private expositions for individuals are also granted, but on much rarer occasions, according to a very ancient tradition that has never been challenged: the first documented exposition of this kind dates back to 1423, when the city municipality resolved that the Holy Crosses, "cum debita reverentia," be shown in private to Pietro Visconti. This happened several times over the centuries, always with municipal permission.

On the other hand, very frequent in the past and now disappeared were the processions in which the Holy Crosses, especially the Illustrious Relic, were carried along the city streets amid monumental processions and liturgical apparatuses, usually to implore divine protection against epidemics, famines, wars and more.

Already mentioned is also the different display methodology reserved for the reliquary of the Holy Thorns and the Cross of Bishop Zane: the two artifacts are in fact the exclusive responsibility of the diocese and are kept in a separate compartment of the safe, for the opening of which the use of the key guarded by the mayor is not necessary. The two reliquaries are therefore taken out and displayed to the public more frequently and on different occasions, such as during Lent.

However, the treasure, despite ordinary and extraordinary displays, remains considerably hidden from the eyes of the public. Gaetano Panazza wrote in 2001, "Precisely because of this multiplicity of its values, it is regrettable to note that it is one of the few treasures that are still not accessible, except with great difficulty and for a very short time, to the veneration of the faithful, to the admiration of scholars."

== See also ==
- Old Cathedral, Brescia
- Santi Faustino e Giovita, Brescia

== Bibliography ==
Ancient sources

- Baitelli, Lodovico (1663). Breve Historia delle Santissime Croci. Brescia.
- Bianchi, Giovanni (1683). Succinta relatione delle solennissime processioni fatte in Brescia quest'anno 1683. Brescia.
- Biemmi, Giammaria (1748). Istoria di Brescia. Vol. 1. Brescia: Per Giovanni Colombo Libraro dietro alla Loggia.
- Brunati, Giuseppe (1839). Di un'antica stauroteca istoriata che si conserva nella vecchia Cattedrale di Brescia. Roma: Tipografia delle Belle Arti.
- Cartari, Giovanni Battista (1663). Le Croci Bresciane ovvero Discorso sopra le croci dell'Oro Fiamma e del Campo. Brescia.
- Cazzago, Alfonso (1718). Libro che contiene tutti i successi di Brescia scritti da me Alfonso Cazzago principiando l'anno 1700 sino a quando Dio mi darà questa vita. Brescia.
- Anonymous chronicler (1799). Compendio storico delle Santissime Croci d'Oro-Fiamma, e del Campo che si venerano nella città di Brescia. Brescia.
- Gagliardi, Filippo (1732). Notizia della santissime croci Orofiamma e del Campo. Brescia.
- Gambara, Francesco (1839). Ragionamenti di cose patrie ad uso della gioventù. Vol. 1. Brescia: Tipografia Venturini.
- Gradenigo, Giovanni Girolamo (1755). Pontificum brixianorum series commentario historico illustrata, opera et studio Joannis Hieronymi Gradonici (in Latin). Brescia: ex typographia Joannis Baptistæ Bossini.
- Malvezzi, Jacopo (1732). "Chronicon Brixianum ab origine urbis ad annum MCCCXXXII". In Ludovico Antonio Muratori (ed.). Rerum Italicarum Scriptores. Vol. XXI. Milano.
- Odorici, Federico (1853). Guida di Brescia - Rapporto alle arti ed ai monumenti antichi e moderni. Brescia: Francesco Cavalieri.
- Rossi, Ottavio (1623). Relatione dell'Aprimento dell'Arca de' Santissimi Protomartiri, et Patroni della Città di Brescia, Faustino, et Giovita. Brescia.
- Rossi, Ottavio (1624). Historia de' Gloriosissimi Santi Martiri Faustino et Giovita. Brescia.
- Sala, Alessandro (1834). Pitture ed altri oggetti di belle arti in Brescia. Brescia.
- Valentini, Andrea (1882). Le Santissime Croci di Brescia. Brescia.

Modern sources

- Accascina, Maria (1934). L'oreficeria italiana. Firenze.
- Alessandro Barbieri (2012). "Il Reliquiario della Santissima Croce del tesoro del Duomo Vecchio di Brescia". Arte Lombarda. Nuova Serie (164/165 (1-2)). Vita e Pensiero: 25–56. ISSN 0004-3443. JSTOR 43106509.
- Begni Redona, Pier Virgilio (2001). "L'apporto dell'arte alla devozione delle Sante Croci". In A.A.V.V. (ed.). Le Sante Croci - Devozione antica dei bresciani. Brescia: Tipografia Camuna.
- Fappani, Antonio, ed. (1978), Enciclopedia bresciana, vol. 3, Brescia: La Voce del Popolo
- Guerrini, Paolo (1924). Il tesoro delle Sante Croci nella storia e nell'arte: discorso letto nella Cattedrale di Brescia la sera del 3 maggio 1924. Brescia: Morcelliana.
- Masetti Zannini, Antonio; Balestrini, Fausto (1996). Pergamena sulla memoria delle Sante Croci.
- Massa, Renata (1988). Orafi e argentieri bresciani nei secoli XVIII e XIX. Brescia: Apollonio.
- Massa, Renata (1997). "Reliquiario delle Sante Spine". In A.A.V.V. (ed.). Nel lume del Rinascimento: dipinti, sculture ed oggetti dalla Diocesi di Brescia. Brescia: Museo diocesano di Brescia.
- Morassi, Antonio (1936). Antica oreficeria italiana. Milano: Hoepli.
- Morassi, Antonio (1939). Catalogo delle cose d'arte e di antichità in Italia: Brescia. Roma: Libreria dello Stato.
- Pagiaro, Sergio (1985). Santuario Sant'Angela Merici. Bagnolo Mella: Litografica Bagnolese.
- Panazza, Gaetano (1977). Il tesoro delle Santissime Croci nel Duomo vecchio di Brescia. Brescia: Compagnia dei Custodi delle Sante Croci.
- Panazza, Gaetano (2001). "Il tesoro delle Sante Croci nel Duomo vecchio di Brescia". In A.A.V.V. (ed.). Le Sante Croci - Devozione antica dei bresciani. Brescia: Tipografia Camuna.
- Panteghini, Ivo (1999). "Il tesoro della chiesa di San Faustino". In A.A.V.V. (ed.). La chiesa e il monastero benedettino di San Faustino Maggiore in Brescia. Brescia: Editrice La Scuola.
- Passamani, Bruno (2001). "Artisti, apparatori, macchine, teatralità per i tridui delle Sante Croci nella "Magnifica Città di Brescia"". In A.A.V.V. (ed.). Le Sante Croci - Devozione antica dei bresciani. Brescia: Tipografia Camuna.
- Peroni, Adriano (1964). "L'oreficeria dei secoli XV e XVI". In Giovanni Treccani degli Alfieri (ed.). Storia di Brescia. Brescia: Treccani.
- Prestini, Rossana (1999). "Regesto". In A.A.V.V. (ed.). La chiesa e il monastero benedettino di San Faustino Maggiore in Brescia. Brescia: Editrice La Scuola.
- Prestini, Rossana (2001). "Regesto storico artistico - Documenti". In A.A.V.V. (ed.). Le Sante Croci - Devozione antica dei bresciani. Brescia: Tipografia Camuna.
- Venturi, Adolfo (1904). "L'esposizione dell'Arte Sacra in Brescia". L'arte. Rome: Danesi – Hoepli.
- Vezzoli, Giovanni (1980). Il Duomo Nuovo e il Duomo Vecchio di Brescia: guida alle cattedrali. Brescia.
- Volta, Valentino (1984). "Il contratto (inedito) di Bernardino con i deputati del Comune". AB - Atlante Bresciano (1).
