= Sarcophagus of Berardo Maggi =

Marble tomb in the Old Cathedral, Brescia

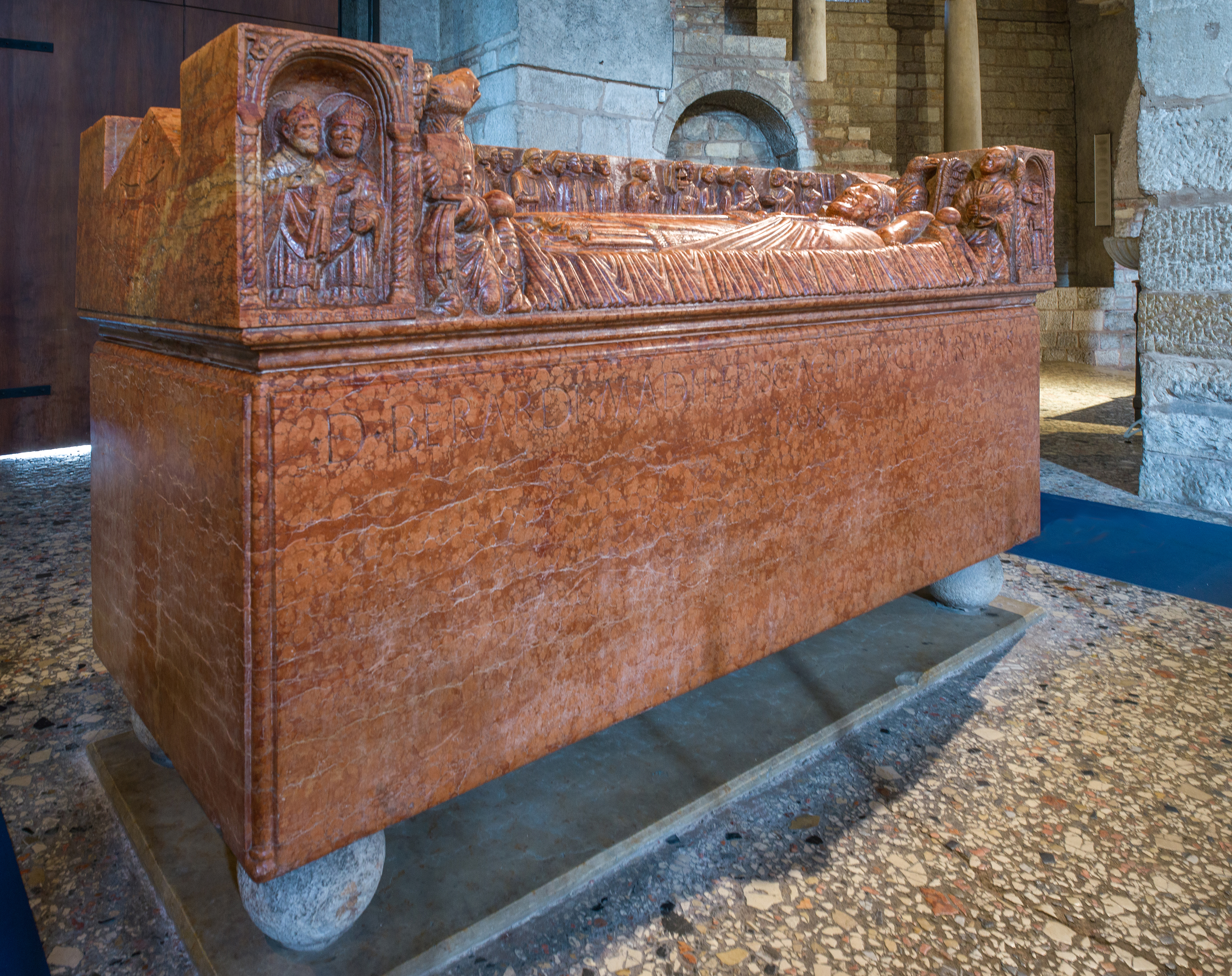
- An overall view of the sarcophagus, seen from the side facing St. Mary's stall
- Artist: Unknown
- Year: 1308-1311
- Medium: Red Verona marble
- Dimensions: 121×197×101.5 cm
- Location: Old Cathedral, Brescia

The Sarcophagus of Berardo Maggi is a sculptural work made of ammonitic red (121×197×101.5 cm) within the first quarter of the 14th century and preserved in the old cathedral of Brescia.

The tomb was made by an unknown local master to preserve the mortal remains of Berardo Maggi, bishop of Brescia from 1275 to 1308 and, from 1298 until his death, prince and lord of the city.

The mausoleum evokes the deeds performed during the deceased's lifetime through a dense and complex iconographic apparatus placed at the lid: Berardo had in fact been a peacemaker in the internal struggles between the Guelphs and Ghibellines of Brescia in 1298, admitting into the city the Ghibelline faction that had been driven out earlier and leading to a situation of substantial reconciliation.

== History ==
=== A sarcophagus for Berardo Maggi ===
Mapheus, princeps electus, Berardus eius fratri mausoleum ex lapide Veronensi sculptum cum obed(ien)tia totius cleri Brixiani et omnium populorum urbis et Brixianae ditionis in Templo Divae Mariae, vocato "La Rotunda", poni curavit
Maffeo, elected prince, with the consent of all the Brescian clergy, all the people of the city and all the most important Brescians, had the funeral mausoleum of his brother Berardo, made of Veronese marble, erected in the church of Santa Maria, known as "La Rotunda".

—Historia Camilli de Maggis patricii Brixiae de rebus patriae, Brescia, Biblioteca Queriniana, Manuscript C.I. 14, c. 310

Possible original location of the tomb: either the so-called St. Mary's Stall (in the foreground), or the high altar (at the back of the chancel)

The quotation is taken from Camillo Maggi's Chronicus de rebus Brixie and indicates how Berardo's brother, Maffeo Maggi, had seen to it that the sarcophagus was placed in the so-called Rotonda, i.e., in Brescia's old cathedral. To explain his brother's intervention, it is appropriate to clarify the events following the death of Berardo, which occurred in 1308: given the need to find a place for his burial and also a worthy sarcophagus for the body, it was the brother Maffeo who took charge of the construction of the sarcophagus and had it placed in the aforementioned place; in truth, it is not known what the original and precise location of the sarcophagus might have been in the context of the cathedral, that is, whether it was near some altar or placed in a possible private chapel, and for this reason it can only be hypothesized: perhaps it was near the high altar; perhaps, instead, in the so-called St. Mary's Stall.

Almost certainly, however, Maggi's tomb established with the church a symbolic as well as artistic dialogue that was quite evident, in addition to being coherent and functional. In any case, this early integration between the work of art and its “container” (the same old cathedral) is precluded to the contemporary observer: in fact, the mausoleum has been placed, since the end of the 19th century, at the entrance to the cathedral and is, therefore, devoid of any integration with altars or liturgical places in the same old cathedral. (Note: See in ACMBS (Archives of the Civic Museums of Brescia), folder 1, in which a handwritten note by Arcioni (most likely dated 1895), containing the planned interventions, reports: Placement of tombstones: preferably on pillars in light [...] Maggi monument: isolated)

==== Chronological placement ====
To clearly frame the chronological space in which the funerary monument was made one can rely, once again, on Camillo Maggi's Chronicus de rebus Brixiae, from which the quotation placed at the beginning is taken. The testimony of the Chronicus, nonetheless, should indeed be considered a valuable source to draw on in outlining the chronological events of the sarcophagus, but it should also be consulted with due caution, given the temporal distance of two centuries between the events narrated and the narrator; moreover, Camillo Maggi never reports, in the course of the narrative, on which sources he relied to describe the facts he sets forth in his work.

The sixteenth-century source, nevertheless, may suggest that Berardo's tomb had already been begun during the last years of his lordship in Brescia (thus in the time span 1303-1308); still following what is said in the Chronicus the sepulchral ark, in the light of the bishop's death in 1308, would have been completed under his brother's directives, as already pointed out above. Moreover, it is the same sixteenth-century chronicle that places the departure of Maffeo during 1311, thus allowing the completion of the sarcophagus to be circumscribed within that same year, namely 1311. Ultimately, it can be concluded that the great sepulchral ark was plausibly completed between the death of Berardo (1308) and that of his brother Maffeo (1311).

=== The sixteenth century through an eighteenth-century testimony ===
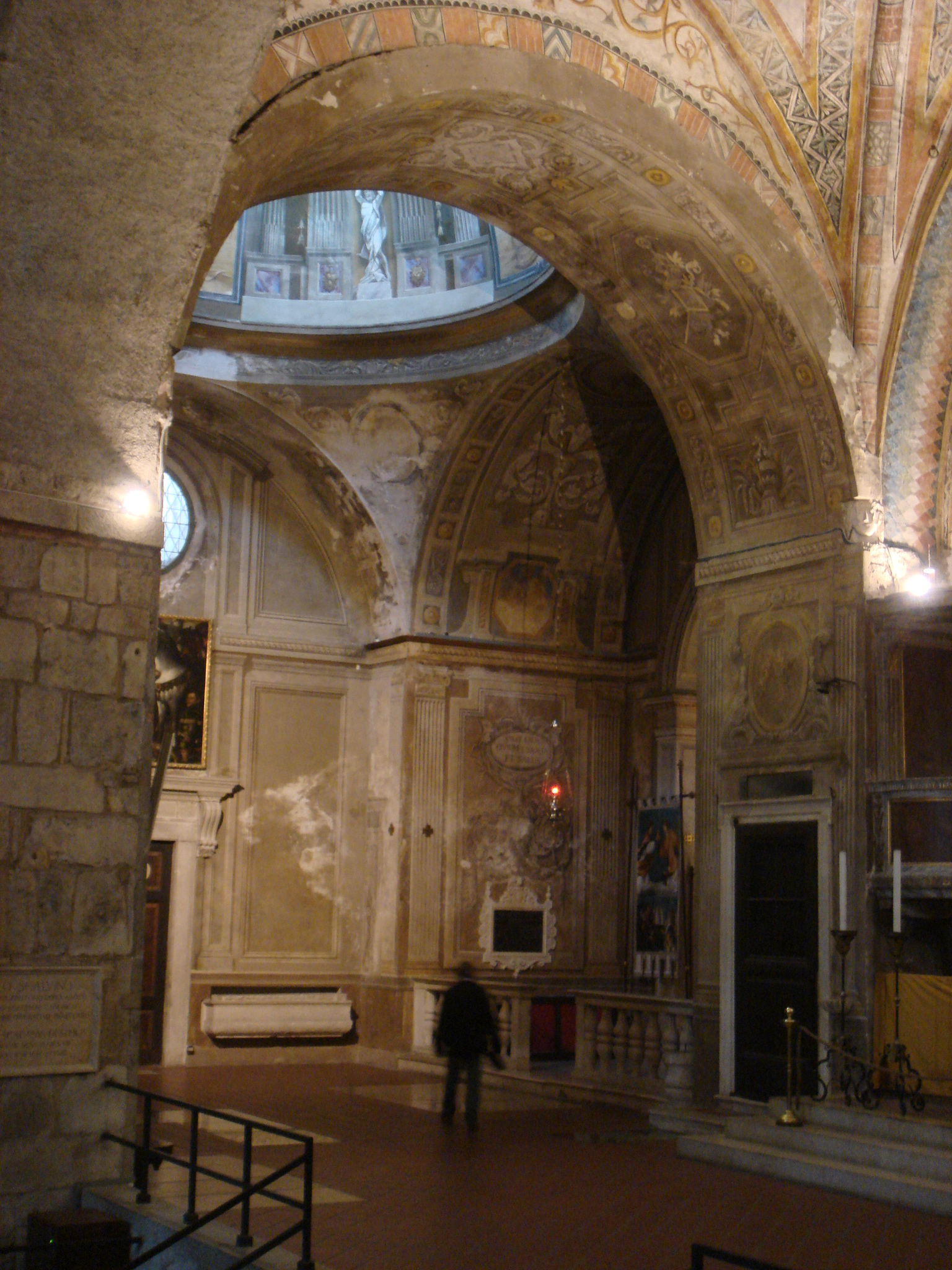
The transept in which, perhaps, the ark was placed in 1571; at that time it communicated, via a corridor, with the basilica of San Pietro de Dom

Whereas throughout the course of the fifteenth century there is no news or sources to report about Maggi's funerary ark, there is instead an important event during the sixteenth century, such as the moving of the sepulchre in question, documented and attributable specifically to 1571: (Note: The displacement of the sarcophagus and its plausible masonry are evidenced by a receipt of payment to the carpenter Gerardo Bottani, dated June 9, 1571, also reported in Zamboni (1778, p. 112 n. 41). (BQ, ms. F. VII.24, f. 170r, Liber boletarum fabrice ecclesie maiori)) this same intervention did not happen in isolation, but rather was part of the larger project, desired and promoted by the then bishop of Brescia Domenico Bollani, of rearranging the interior of the cathedral. In light of this, the funeral monument, from its original and unknown location, was moved, elevated and in all probability walled up near the chapel of the Sante Croci, (Note: See precisely the testimony present in Zamboni (1778, pp. 112–113), In which he states that: [...] the magnificent monument of Berardo Maggi, bishop and prince of Brescia, was transported from the Rotonda, where it had been at the time of his death, to the site of the Chapel of the Sante Croci, where it still stands presently [...] the ark still lies in the Chapel of the Sante Croci, above the door that once led to the church of San Pietro) as reported by Baldassarre Zamboni, archpriest of Calvisano. Also according to the latter's testimony, the ark would have been fixed in the wall of the left transept (perhaps placed on the tympanum of a door, which in turn communicated with the corridor through which the adjacent basilica of San Pietro de Dom could be reached). The modification of the interior of the church was attributable to reasons of space and better usability of the place of worship, in order to improve its use for the faithful: hence the ark was moved and placed precisely in an elevated location.

As a result of this plausible masonry of the sarcophagus, it can be inferred that one of its two sides was sacrificed out of view and is no longer visible: it is perhaps on this occasion, among other things, that an inscription was made on the marble case by means of a graphic style in an ideal humanistic capital, quite different from the fourteenth-century style of the rest of the sarcophagus. Further evidence for a presumed posteriority of the inscription on the chest is the use, in the same, of Arabic numerals, which in the fourteenth century were still not so widely used; another element in favor of this interpretation is the presence of the term “princeps,” never used in Maggi's lifetime, who, on the contrary, always wished to define himself as “Arbiter et arbitrator.” Also at the same juncture, moreover, would also have been added the circular supports at the base of the casket (22 cm in diameter each), made of gray stone and recurring, in many cases and as a type, in Renaissance sculpture: a further evidence, this last one, of an evident reworking of the fourteenth-century tomb in the midst of the Renaissance age. The text of the inscription affixed to the casket reads as follows:

D(OMINI) • BERARDI • MADII • EPISC(OPI) • AC PRINCIP(IS) • URB(IS) • BRI(XIAE) • S(EPULCRUM) • / • 1308

Wall tombs in the Old Cathedral

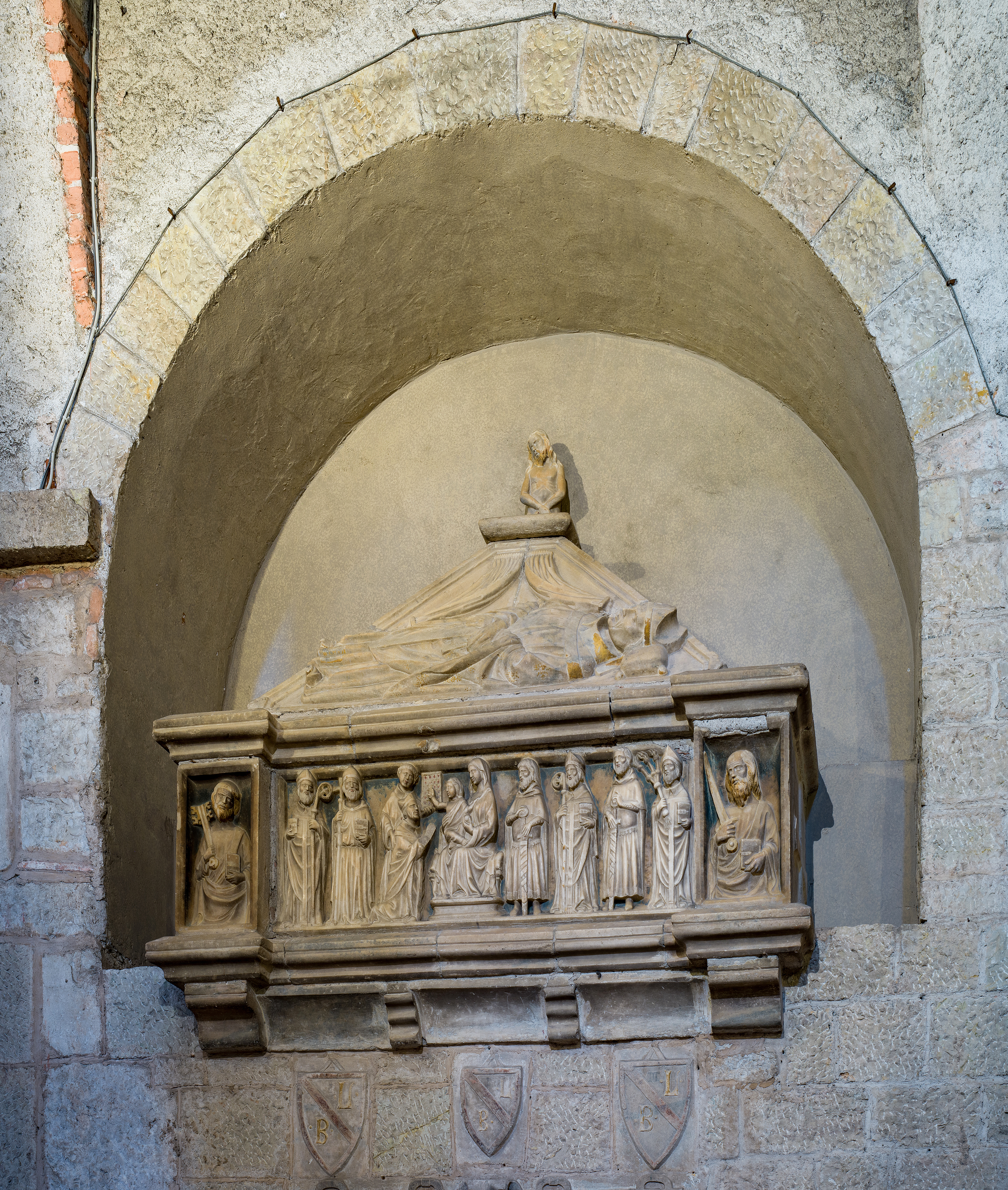
The tomb of Balduino Lambertini

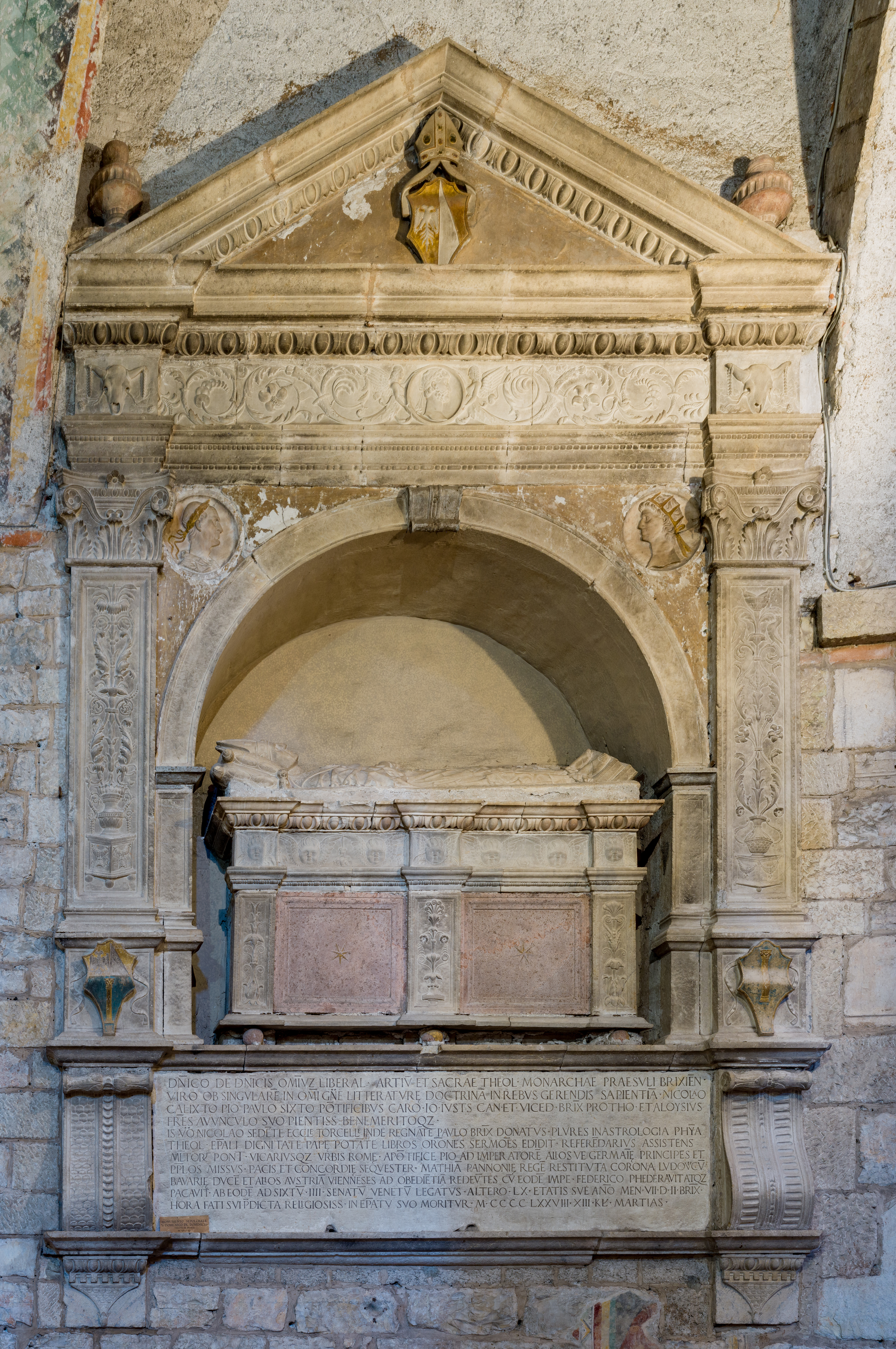
The sarcophagus of Domenico de Dominici

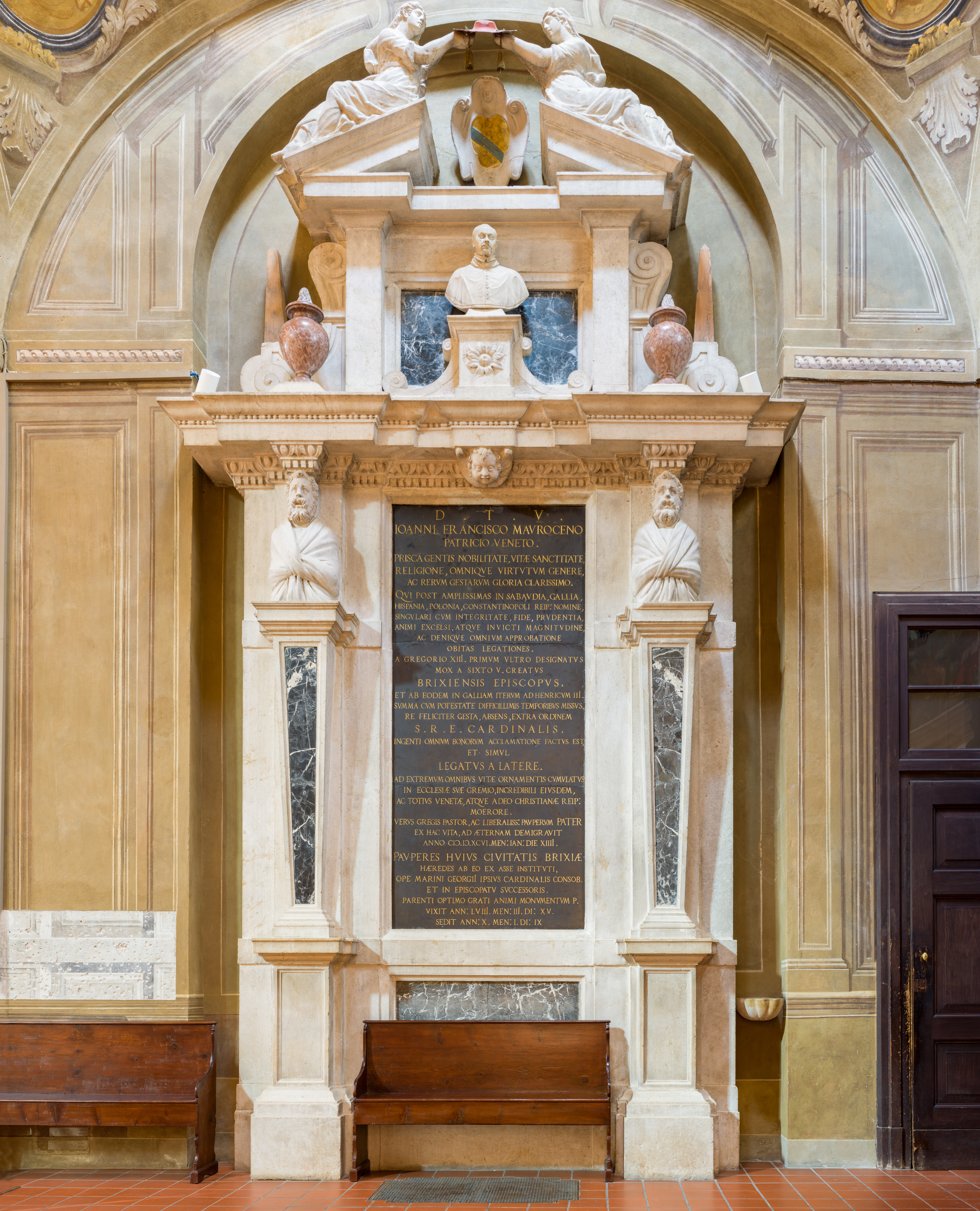
The memorial for Gianfrancesco Morosini

This supposed sixteenth-century elevation of the sarcophagus, admittedly quite complicated both by its size and weight, would have led Maggi's tomb to harmonize and conform with the other examples of funerary monuments in the old cathedral, all of which were walled up and substantially used as wall decorations, such as the case of Domenico de Dominici's funeral monument, that of Balduino Lambertini, and that of Gianfrancesco Morosini. However, establishing with absolute certainty what the exact location of the tomb was, and whether it was actually walled up as reported earlier, is a very difficult subject: it has already been mentioned how difficult it would have been to hoist the ark and fix it to the wall in question, without then considering the possible structural failures should the masonry have been in all respects completed, especially in the absence of buttresses to support its enormous weight; according to the testimonies provided by Zamboni, Rossi and Brunati the tomb would have been hoisted and placed in the wall in question, although in reality this is highly unlikely, for all the reasons mentioned above. Instead, it is more plausible that the heavy sarcophagus was indeed raised and placed against the wall, but not walled in.

=== The eighteenth and nineteenth centuries ===
Following a silence that lasted throughout the course of the seventeenth century, it was the aforementioned Baldassarre Zamboni who reported in his work, after the second half of the eighteenth century, news about Maggi's tomb, also taking care to produce prints, illustrations and deeds regarding its history: all this is accomplished through the use of documentation and notes to support the text, evaluating what was said on the basis of personal research about Brescian public life in previous centuries. It is precisely through the testimony offered by Zamboni that the situation of the ark, i.e., its position in the cathedral and the condition in which it was located, can be recorded contextually at the time: in fact, a drawing provided in the codex makes it possible to understand that the funerary monument was located within a niche and with the supporting spheres at its base, added during the Renaissance period and already mentioned above.

Another important depiction, this time of the 19th century, is provided by the historian Federico Odorici, who precisely in 1856 produced a drawing depicting the same ark: (Note: The quotation given is again found in Odorici (1856, p. 278) [...] Brunati [perhaps Benedetto] had the beautiful picture we bring you [referring to the illustration of the ark in the text] removed from the wall that completely enclosed it.) he prefers, in this case, to report the most hidden side of the sarcophagus, that is, the one that is close to the wall and for this reason less visible; later he also illustrates the more exposed side but on a smaller scale. It is again Odorici, moreover, who reports in his Guide to Brescia that the funerary monument, at the time, was accessible to the observer by means of a “ladder at the back of the monument,” further remarking the elevated position of Maggi's ark.

==== The restorations of the Old Cathedral by Luigi Arcioni ====
Maggi's ark and its placements in the cathedral

There has already been extensive discussion of the possible placements that the ark had over the centuries in the old cathedral; however, based also on the Arcioni papers preserved in the museum of Santa Giulia, it can be deduced that, before being placed at the entrance to the place of worship, the funerary monument rested on a stone or marble entablature in the northwest area of the chapel of the Sante Croci, at the height of the tympanum of the adjacent door: based on this version, therefore, the sarcophagus was simply at the height of the top of the passageway (and not necessarily above it), as recorded by all previous sources called into question, including the testimony of Baldassarre Zamboni.

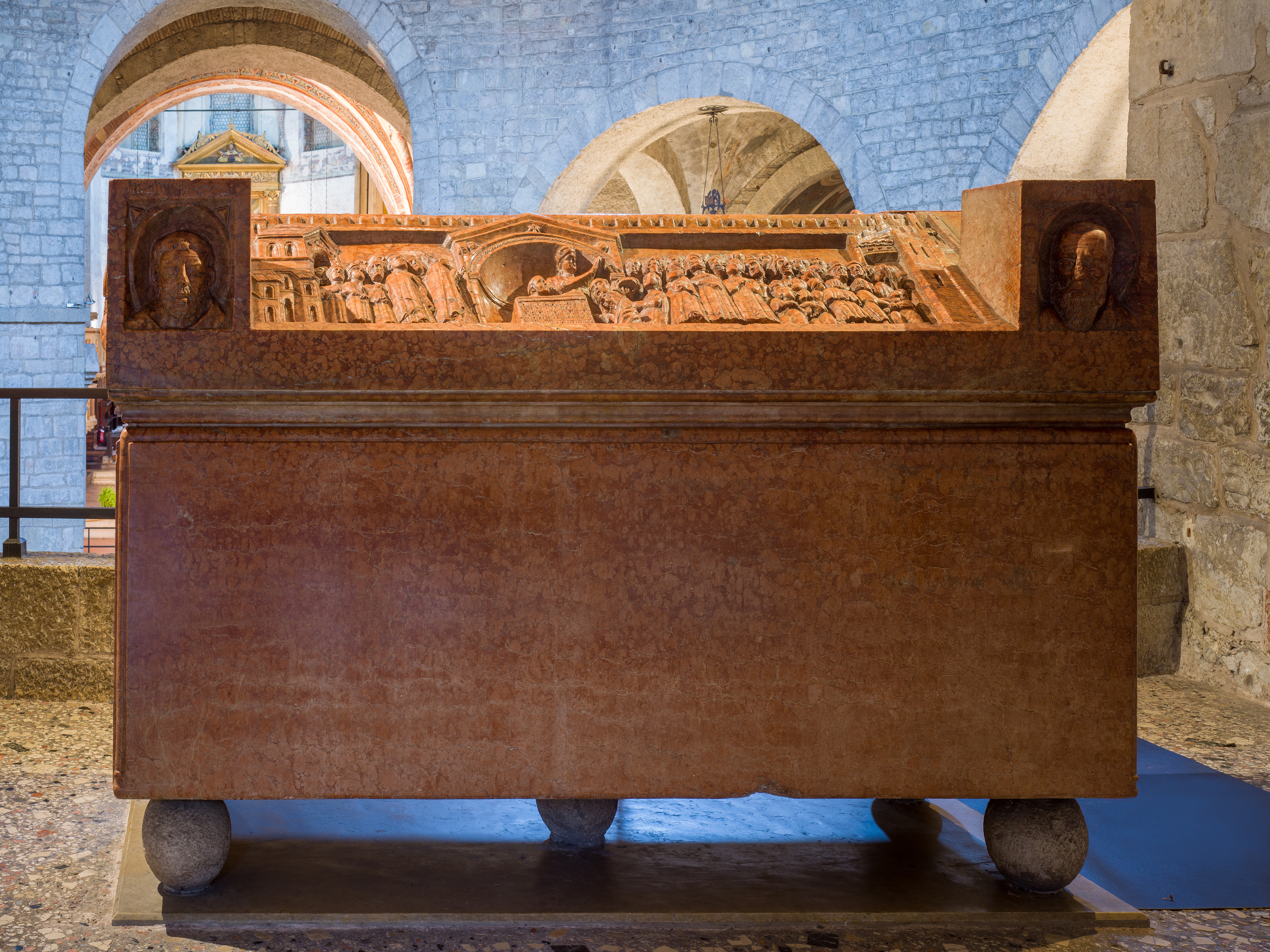
Maggi's Ark, placed at the entrance to the cathedral in the late 1800s, where it has remained ever since

Close to the end of the 19th century, construction sites for the restoration of the old cathedral were begun, supervised and directed by architect Luigi Arcioni. He was able to carry out well-targeted interventions aimed at the arrangement of the place of worship, such as, for example, razing the cathedral's interior roofing, reconstructing the original lowered Romanesque double-entrance: he also remarked the position of the pillars by covering them and also highlighting the floor of the ambulatory; he unearthed the ancient crypt of St. Philastrius, which had been sealed up until then and used as a mass grave, reconstructing its entrances; he rediscovered, among other things, the foundations of the previous cathedral, the basilica of Santa Maria Maggiore de Dom, marking its perimeter in the pavement by the use of darker stones and also uncovering some of its floor mosaics.

In general, moreover, he accomplished a rearrangement of the liturgical furnishings, isolating them and making them stand out to further enhance their symbolic and cultural value; an operation accomplished in the same way for the sarcophagus of Berardo Maggi. The restoration of the old cathedral was therefore conceived as a total renovation of the ecclesiastical building, with the aim of returning the same structure to the community with a new mission: having lost its role as the city's cathedral in favor of the new one, it was much more suited to a museographic role, as a container of works of art and the city's history. (Note: This new vocation of the old cathedral would find its final fulfillment in the exhibition of sacred art organized in 1904.) As a result of this general reassessment, Maggi's funerary monument was removed from the wall where it had stood for more than three centuries and placed in front of the entrance to the Cathedral, in a much more prominent and isolated position, without any integration with the other works of art in the Cathedral.

== Description ==
=== General view ===
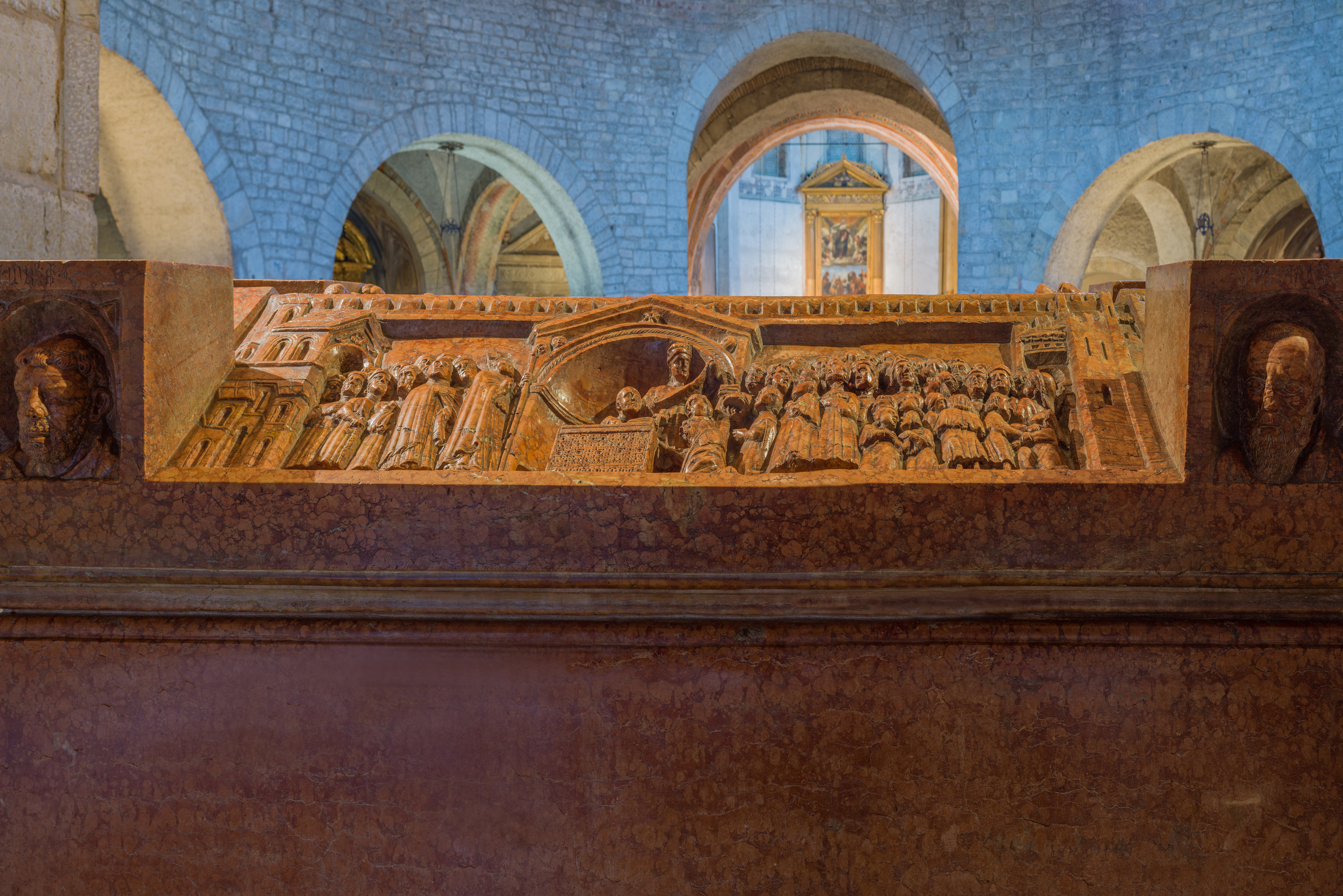
The side depicting the Peace of 1298

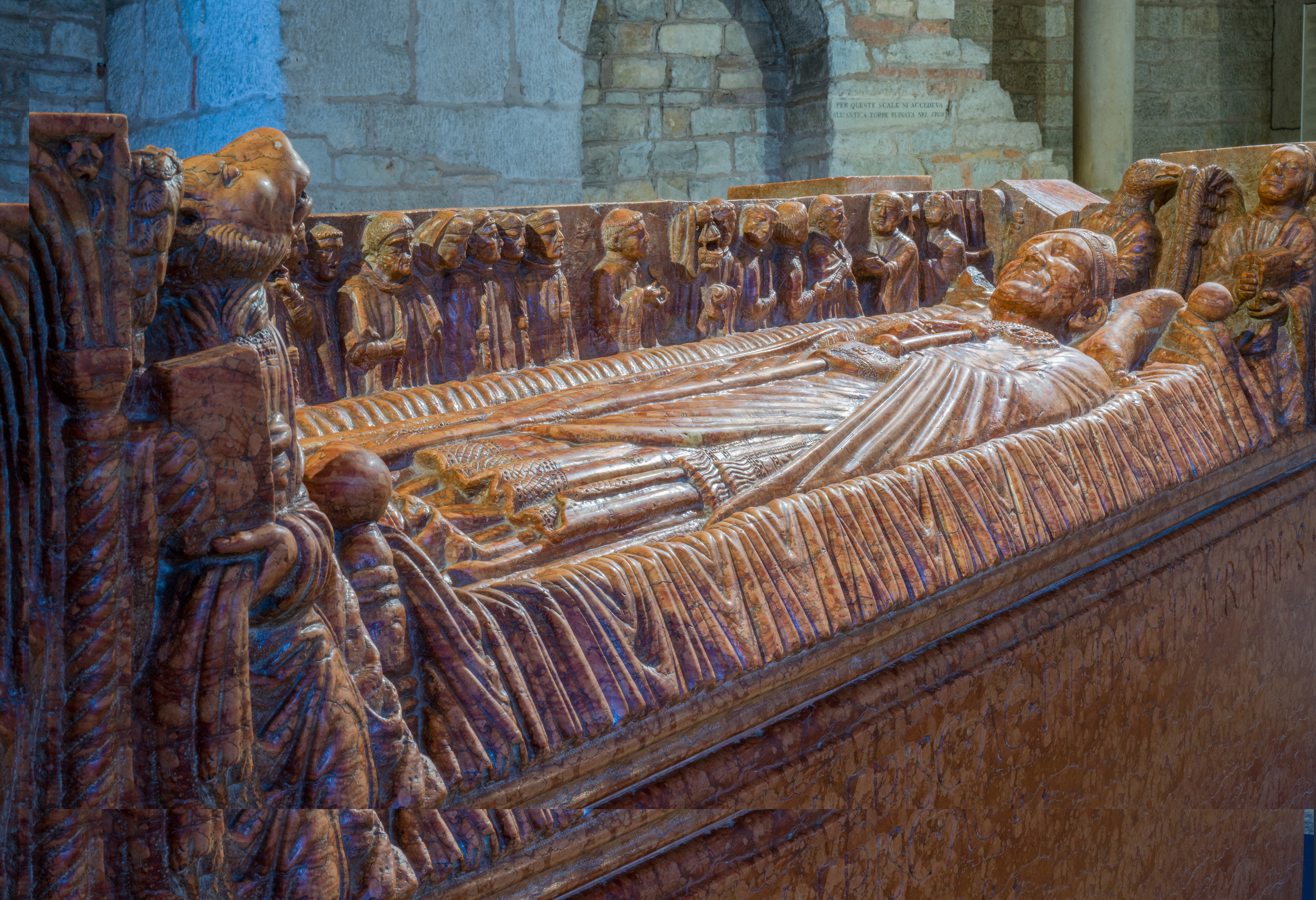
The side with the Obsequies and the body of Maggi

The sarcophagus consists at the lower level of a smooth aniconic case, i.e., devoid of images or depictions, and at the upper level of a lid with sloping pitches (or also definable as “roofed”), with parallelepiped acroteria at the four corners of each side. The type of the ark is that of the so-called Ravenna sarcophagus, i.e. of all the funerary monuments that were established from the first century A.D. and came back into vogue, during the fourteenth century, as a result of the great availability of materials and marbles of the ancient age, used especially in funerals of great prestige; these same burials had the ultimate purpose, moreover, of remaining at ground level and being observed by the faithful. The urn's roofed composition, moreover, is a rather recurring pattern in the Lombard, Venetian and Emilian context of the late thirteenth and mid-fourteenth centuries. In any case, the work presents artistic and iconographic elements attributable not only to recurring models in a supra-regional, and therefore peninsular, tradition, but also to purely local aspects that accentuate its unique and very particular characteristics.

The material used, in terms of supra-regional patterns and therefore established archetypes, is the ammonitic red of Valpolicella, a type of marble that was widely used in Lombard episcopal circles towards the end of the thirteenth century: The reddish color of the stone used was in fact intended to reconnect and recall the tradition of imperial burials in ancient red porphyry, further consolidating the prestige and authority of the deceased; on the other hand, an equally explicit reference is made to certain funerary models to "justify the antiquity of the metropolitan dignity and the first diocese." Some notable examples are the sarcophagus of Ariberto da Intimiano and the ark containing the remains of Saint Ambrose.

On the side facing the entrance to the cathedral is depicted the so-called Peace of Berardo Maggi, a crucial event in the city's history which took place in 1298, as a result of which the Guelph and Ghibelline factions of the city had reconciled; on the opposite flap of the lid (i.e., the one facing St. Mary's Stall), on the other hand, is depicted Berardo's body, effigyed with the appropriate sacred vestments: parallel to the top of the lid and along the entire length of the catafalque, in the background, is instead depicted the funeral scene, in which a host of clergymen and canons appear.

==== An unfinished funerary monument ====
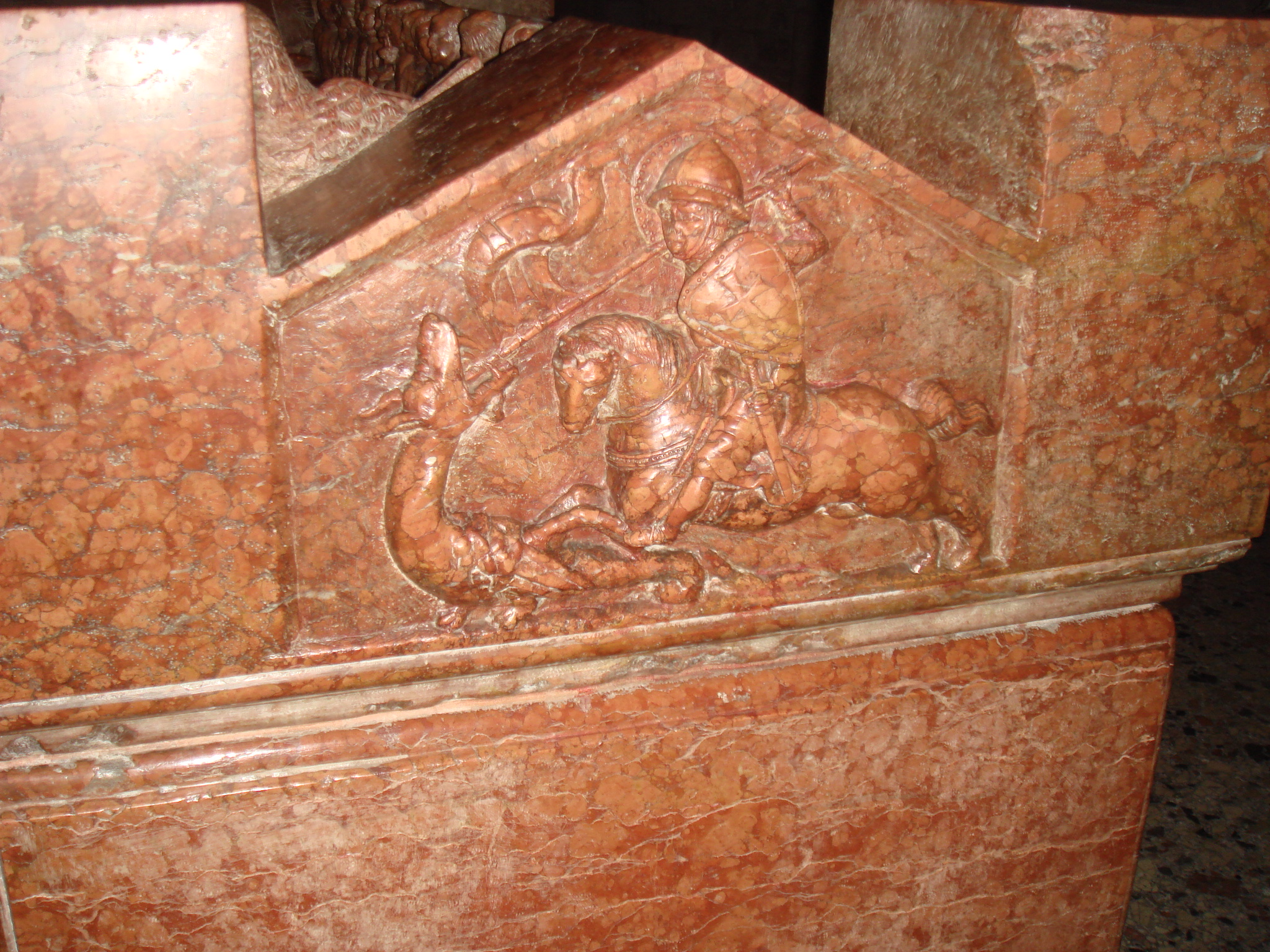
The short side with St. George and the dragon

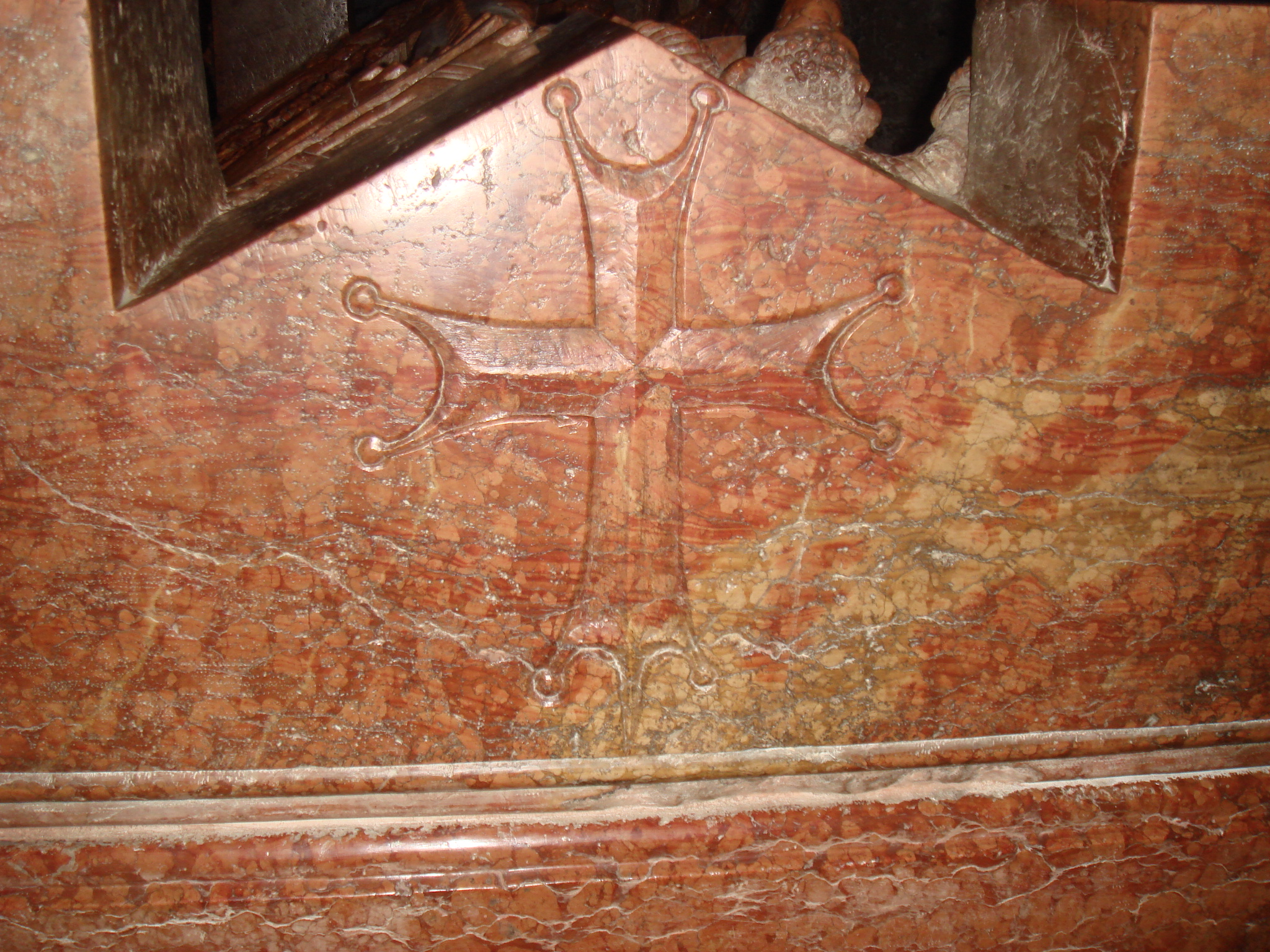
The cross pattée on the opposite side

On the two shorter sides of the funerary monument the scenes depicted are different, both in terms of the technique used and the type of depiction: on one of them the traditional iconographic model of St. George slaying the dragon is used, a recurring symbol of the struggle between forces of good and evil: in the scene the saint uses, to strike the beast, a spear resembling the oriflamme of Brescia; on the opposite side is historiated a cross pattée of simple workmanship, shallow and lacking a frame, as opposed to the other short side: the central part of the arms and the barely noticeable workmanship of the cross - suggesting a certain three-dimensional play - suggest that the sepulchral ark on this specific side was left unfinished; further evidence in support of this hypothesis is the lack of a frame at the edges of the side, something that is present instead in the depiction of Saint George slaying the dragon.

A slight drill-work on the border, at the base of the depiction of peace, suggests the context of a narrative and iconographic program that was suddenly interrupted, perhaps precisely as a result of Berardo's sudden death in 1308: the latter had in all probability commissioned and participated personally in the conception of the scenes and narrative models of the ark, corresponding, as already mentioned, to his last years of life. As proof of this, moreover, the lack of an epitaph is worth noting: given the complex iconographic and artistic structure of the funerary ark, it seems implausible that it could have lacked a dedication illustrating the prestige of the deceased.

=== The side of the Peace of Berardo Maggi ===
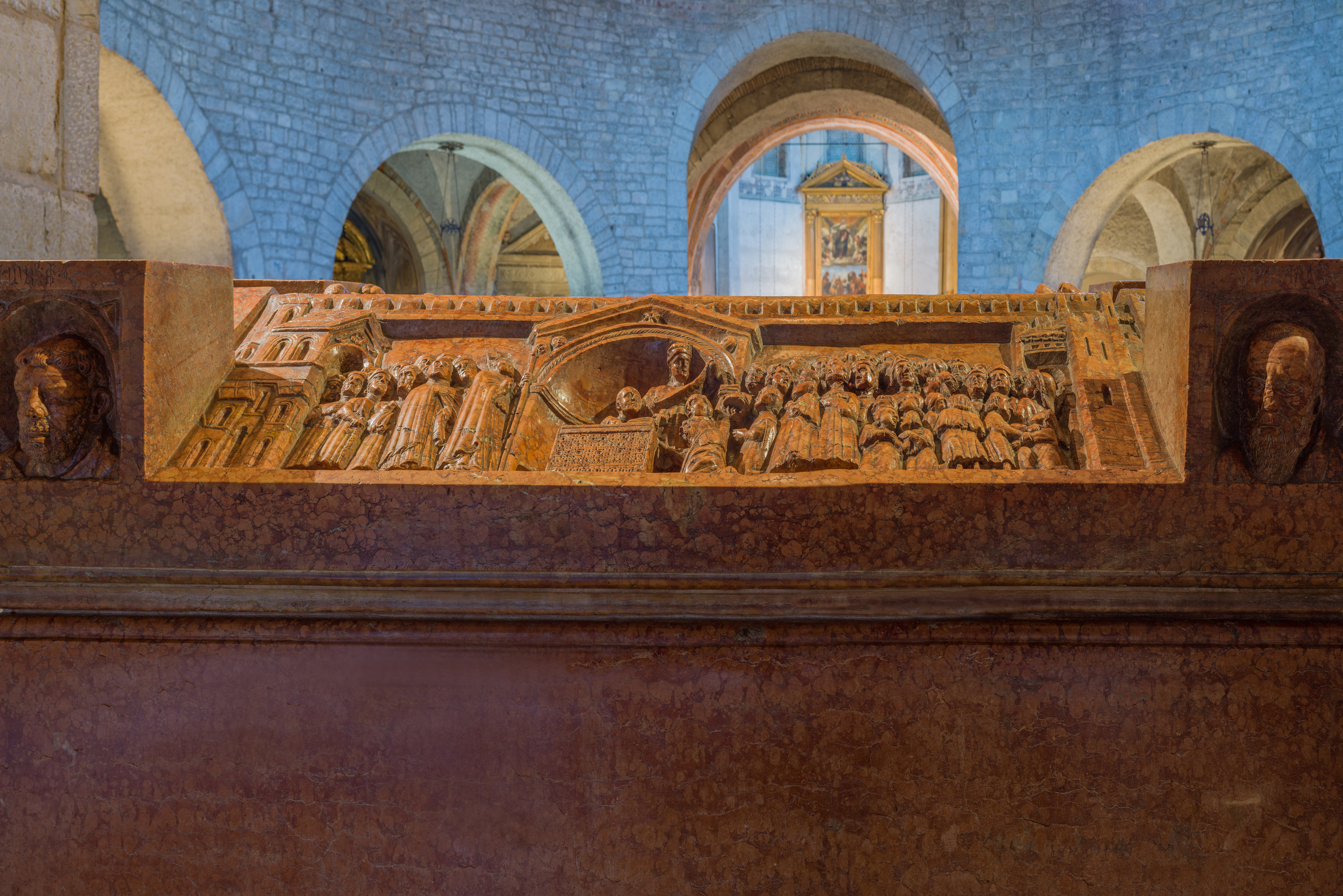
The ark observed from the entrance of the old cathedral.

In the tomb effigy placed in front of the entrance of the cathedral, as already pointed out, the scene of the so-called Peace of Berardo Maggi can be observed: the complex iconographic and figurative apparatus of this scene is worthy of analysis, since the reported event constitutes perhaps the most important event, as well as an ideal synthesis, of Berardo Maggi's entire lordship in Brescia.

The scene spans the entire length of the flap of the lid, as if trying to make use of all the space available (180.5×55 cm). It is in fact enclosed, ideally, by the two acroteria placed at the edges of the lid; the depicted event is further circumscribed, then, by the battlements of the city walls and features a subdivision of the host of men into several groups, all of whom converge toward the altar depicted in the center of the scene. From left to right, this is how the complex procession is articulated:

1. A group of ecclesiastical dignitaries and laymen (among whom are the captain of the people, placed in the center and distinguishable by the shield he holds, and the podestà, identifiable by the sword he wears at his waist and still placed in its scabbard) proceeds toward the structure in the center of the flap and is led at the head by Berardo Maggi, depicted in a blessing attitude: the only figure to present a mutilated or otherwise damaged face, the bishop then wears a mitre, cingulum, cope, and carries a crosier in his left hand; the group behind him moves in unison from a building located on the left end of the flap, a church with a longitudinal plan, covered with tiles and visible on the scene in its central nave, with buttresses at the side aisles: this is the ancient basilica of San Pietro de Dom, a place appointed for the meetings of the Pars Ecclesiae, i.e., the faction that ruled the city at the time and to which Maggi himself belonged.
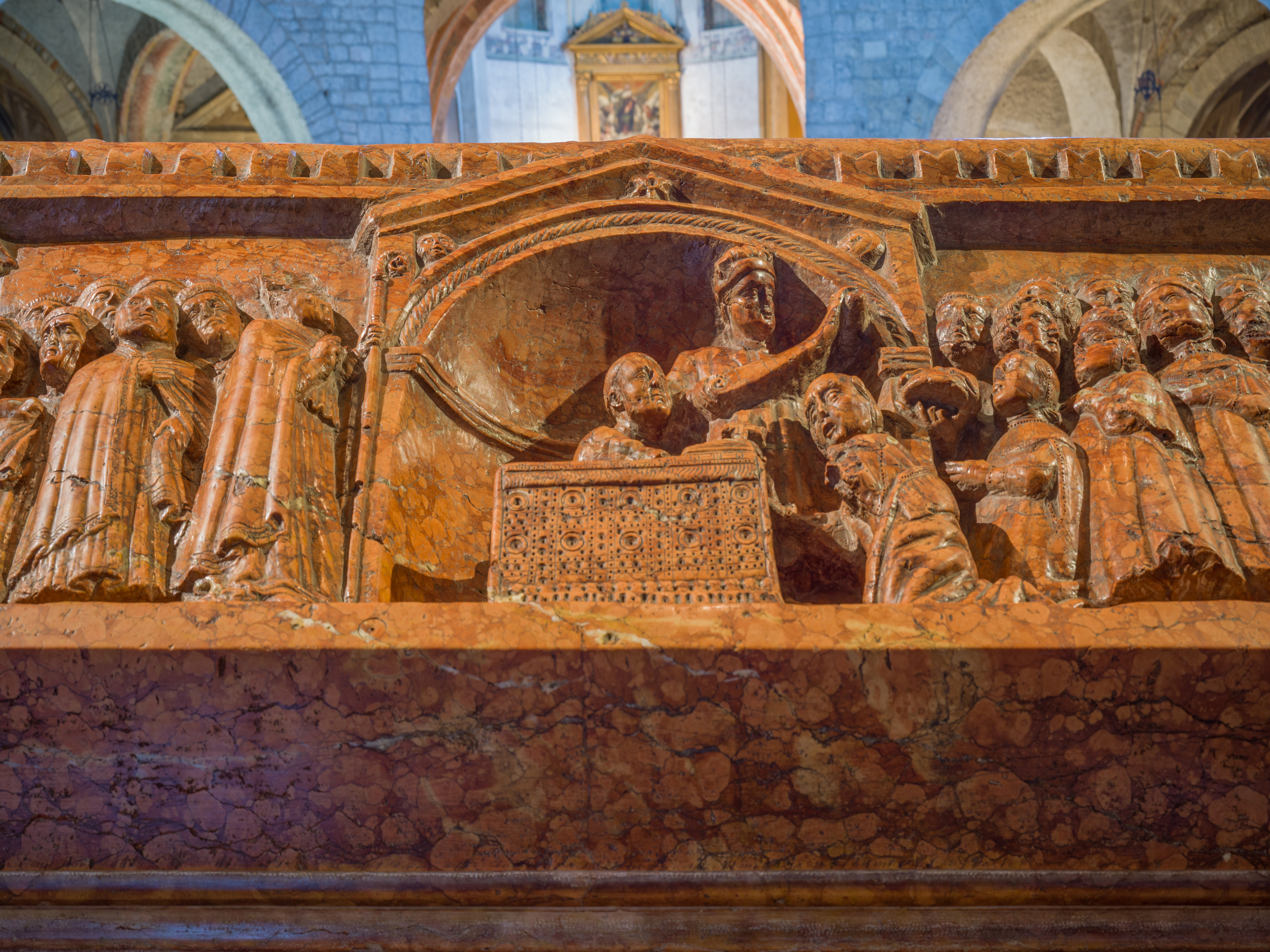
  The central scene of the oath at the very center of the flap
2. At the center of the flap is the scene of the oath, which takes place in a centrally planned and most likely Romanesque building of worship: the major arch, depicted at the height of the battlements, is studded with the symbols of the Sun, Moon and Stars, intended to recall the frescoes found in the presbytery of the old cathedral (Note: On the western arch of the vault, these same elements frame a clipeus with the Virgin Mary in the interior, surrounded by angels.) and inspired by the medieval theory of the Sun and Moon; indeed, it is appropriate to mention also the existence, in the cathedral square at the time, of the baptistery of St. John, also with a central plan and another potential site of the oath. The reasons, however, for considering the use of the Romanesque cathedral more plausible are many: the already mentioned fresco of the presbytery, the fact that the Rotunda itself was precisely the seat of the bishop's chair, and the considerable greater capacity that the cathedral had compared to the already mentioned baptistery. In the idealized depiction of the old cathedral, therefore, the oath-taking ceremony takes place, more precisely at an altar that is illustrated, on the flap, as if to recall an antependium: right at the antependium and in first view, a civic official is bent over and presenting the objects involved in the declaration, namely, a book, held with his right hand, and a cross, which is instead held with his left hand; another figure depicted in the cathedral, albeit in the background, is a lay official, plausibly a notary or herald: depicted wearing a toga and cap, he is intent on reading the sententia issued by the bishop on an unrolled roll of parchment. Next to the two is portrayed a miles, i.e., a soldier, in the act of kneeling and with his hand on the Gospel, almost like a vassal, solemnly swearing on it.
3. The last part of the procession is the one included, again looking from left to right, between the church building in the center of the flap and a turreted structure (Note: It could also be a civilian structure, such as a town hall.) on its far right, which is fortified, given the stone block motif with which it is presented and its roofing of Monk and Nun tiles on beams: from the same door on the right, then, comes a host of men intent on listening to the conditions of the oath, or at any rate on witnessing the ceremony of pacification. The various reactions and attitudes reported are manifold, as is the clothing of each member of the procession: some are dressed as cives (citizens) and are depicted kissing each other, as if to testify to internal pacification; others, at times kneeling and at times reluctant, wear only a skirt cinched at the waist, indicating their peasant background and thus their origin from the nearby Brescian countryside.

==== The type of depiction and the two acroteria of the flap ====
The Peace's iconographic and figurative choices recall ancient sarcophagi in a certain way, alluding also - in the tripartite array of characters - to the structure of the miniatures in Carolingian Bibles. The scene, among other things, seems to continually oscillate between macrocosm and microcosm, in a very subtle bivalence that is analogous to the earthly city-celestial city dichotomy. Reducing the decorative apparatus to its load-bearing framework, one thus identifies in the central scene of the oath the iconography of the so-called Traditio Pacis, a variant of the Traditio legis; on either side of the latter, as if to frame and adorn it, are in fact housed in the two respective acroteria the apostles Peter and Paul.

With the aforementioned types of subjects and figurative modes, the desire to remember Berardo as a peacemaker, a grantor of laws and therefore of Peace clearly shines through: all aimed at recalling the very ancient iconography, of early Christian memory, of the reading of a sententia; the context, then, is further reinforced by the presence of Peter and Paul, eponymous saints of the other Brescian cathedral of the time.

=== The side of the Obsequies and the corpse ===
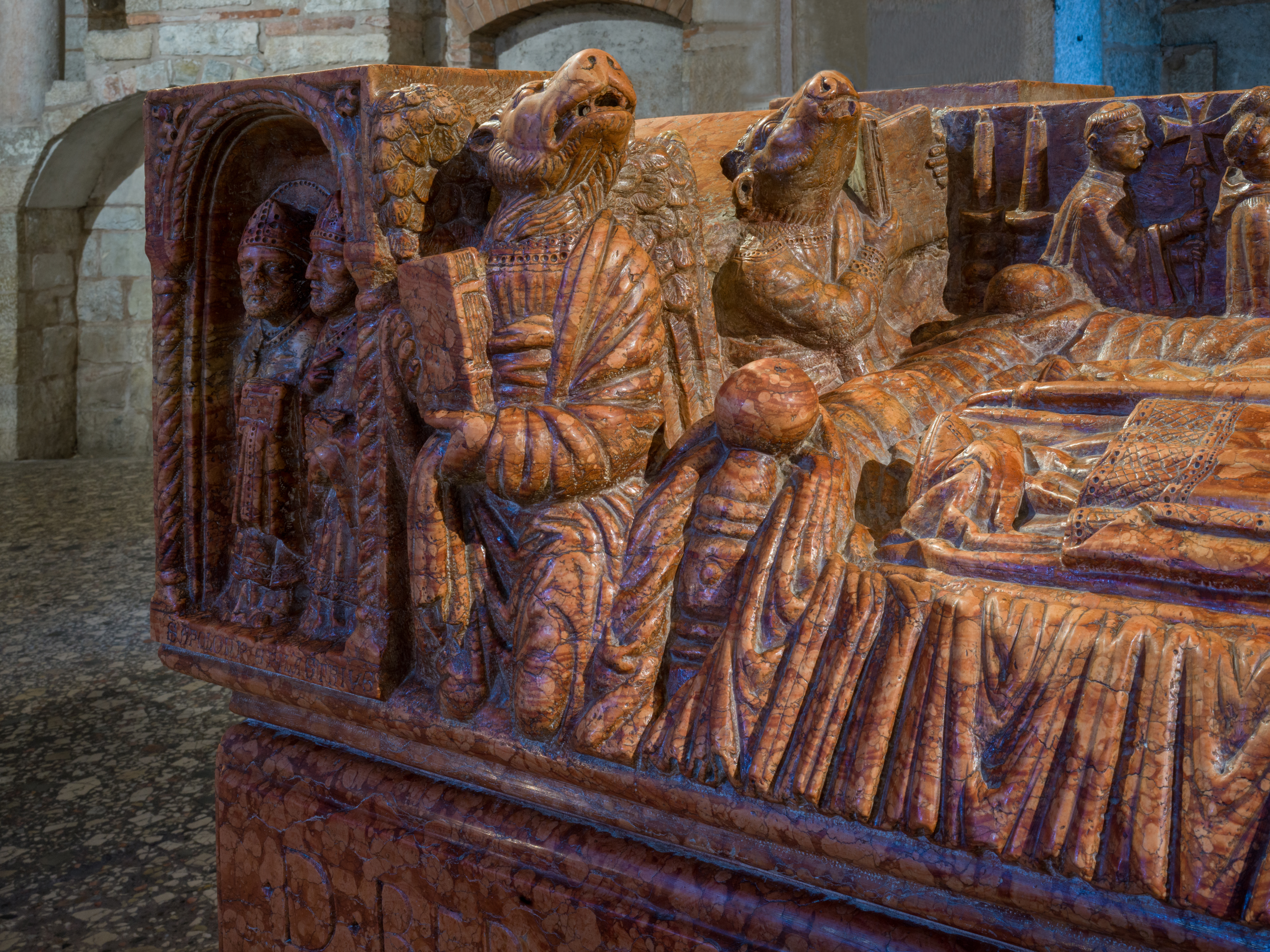
Symbols of the Evangelists

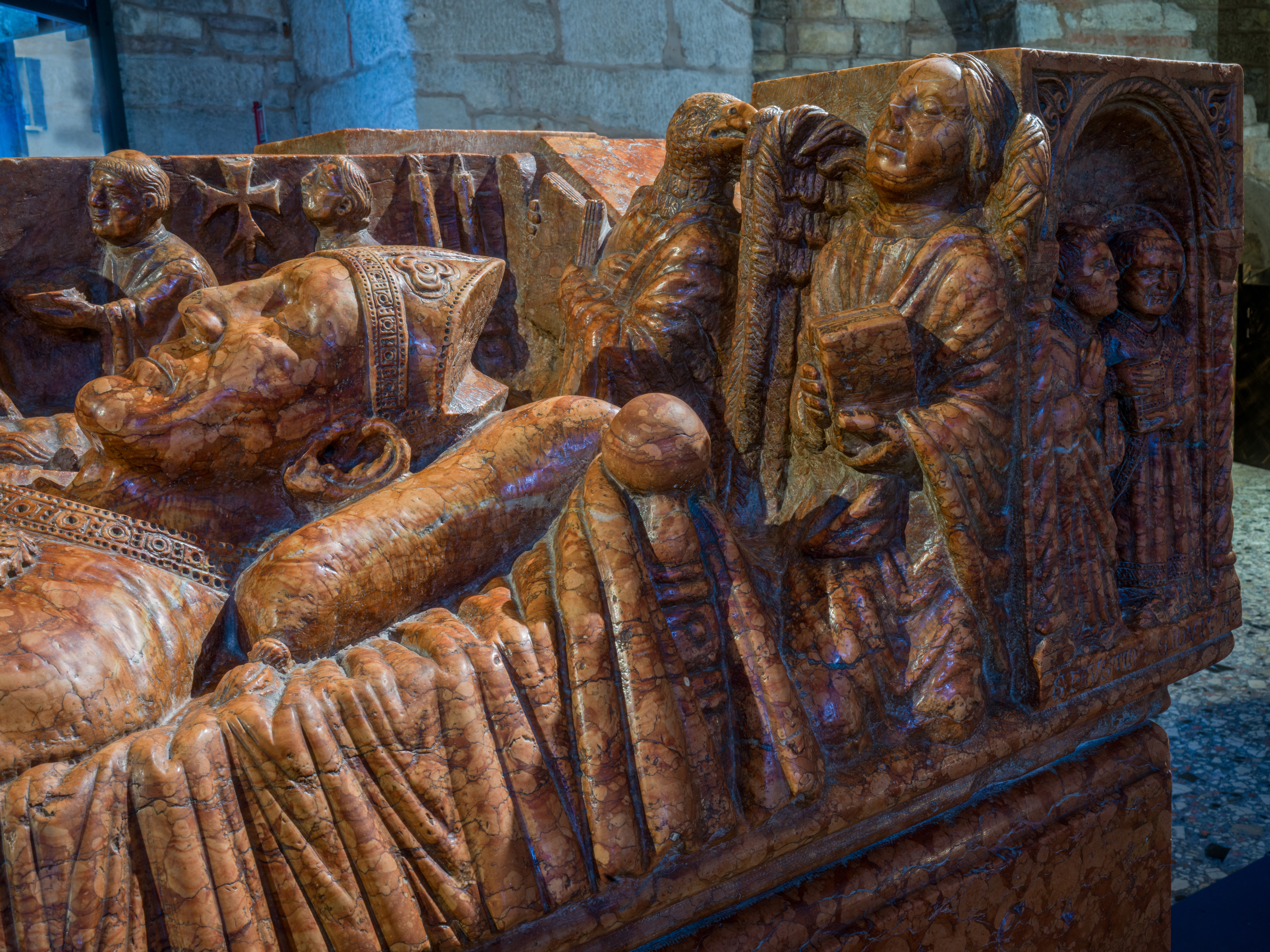
Symbols of the Evangelists

On the back side, the tomb effigy sinks into the coffin, bringing out only the four wooden knobs, finely chiseled at the lathe; the catafalque, on the other hand, contrary to the knobs, is covered by a sumptuous drape and therefore not visible. Lying and stretched out on the latter is Maggi's body, watched over at the four corners by the apocalyptic symbols of the evangelists: whether seated or kneeling, such figures are characterized by a noteworthy formal refinement, both in their postures and in the various attitudes each one displays. Also noteworthy are the details in the clothing, which is very fine and sumptuous, as well as the anthropomorphic features with which they are portrayed, except for the three animal heads.

The acroterium placed at Maggi's head depicts the patron saints of Brescia, Faustinus and Jovita, enclosed within a pair of twisted columns; they are parallel and ideally related both to the opposite acroterium, the one depicting St. Peter, and to the short side of the ark on which St. George is depicted; the other acroterium, depicting the bishops Apollonius and Philastrius, is in turn connected with the depiction of St. Paul and that of the cross pattée, belonging to the other short side.

The iconography of the blessing attitude

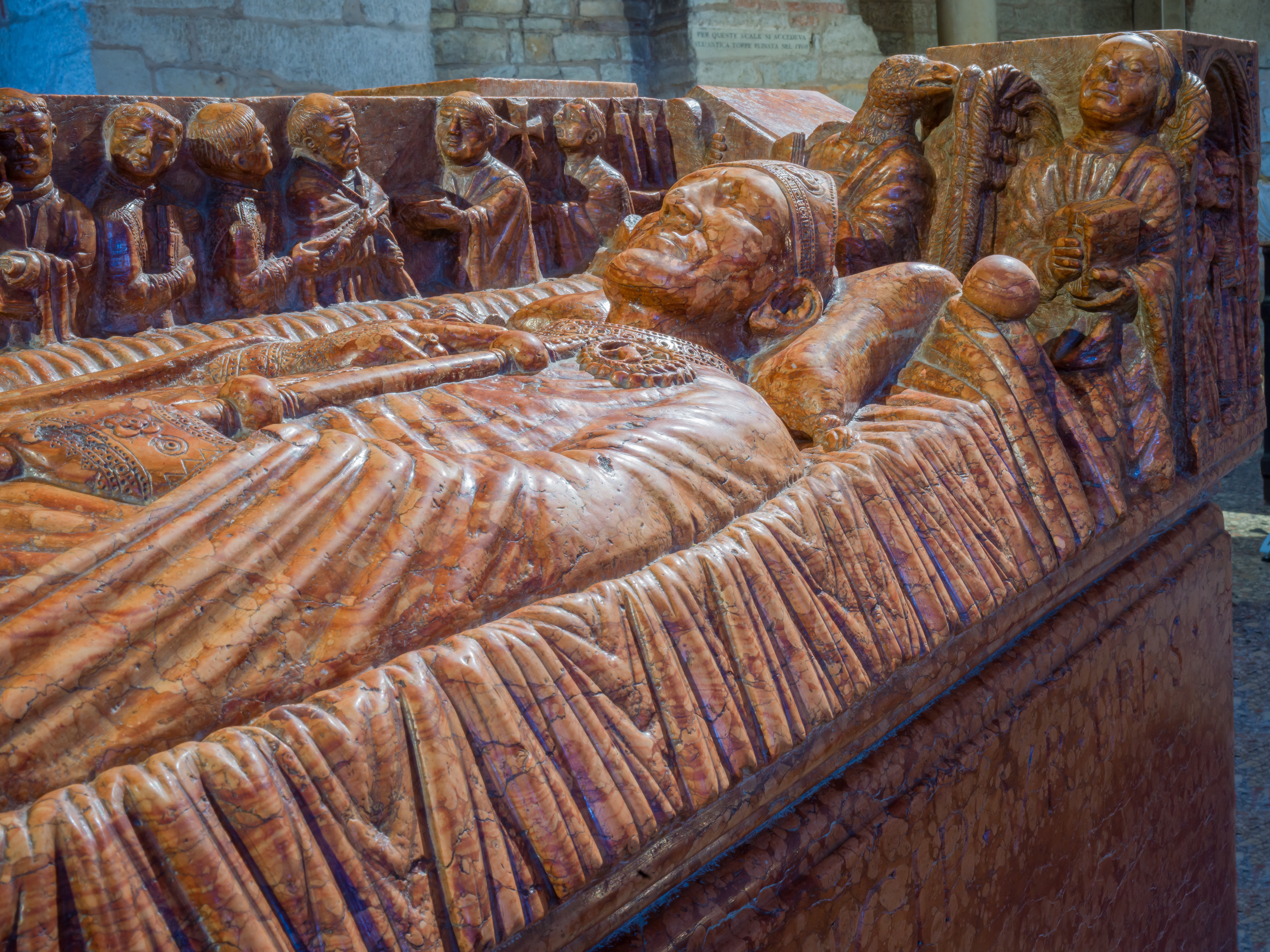
The blessing attitude on the effigy of the ark

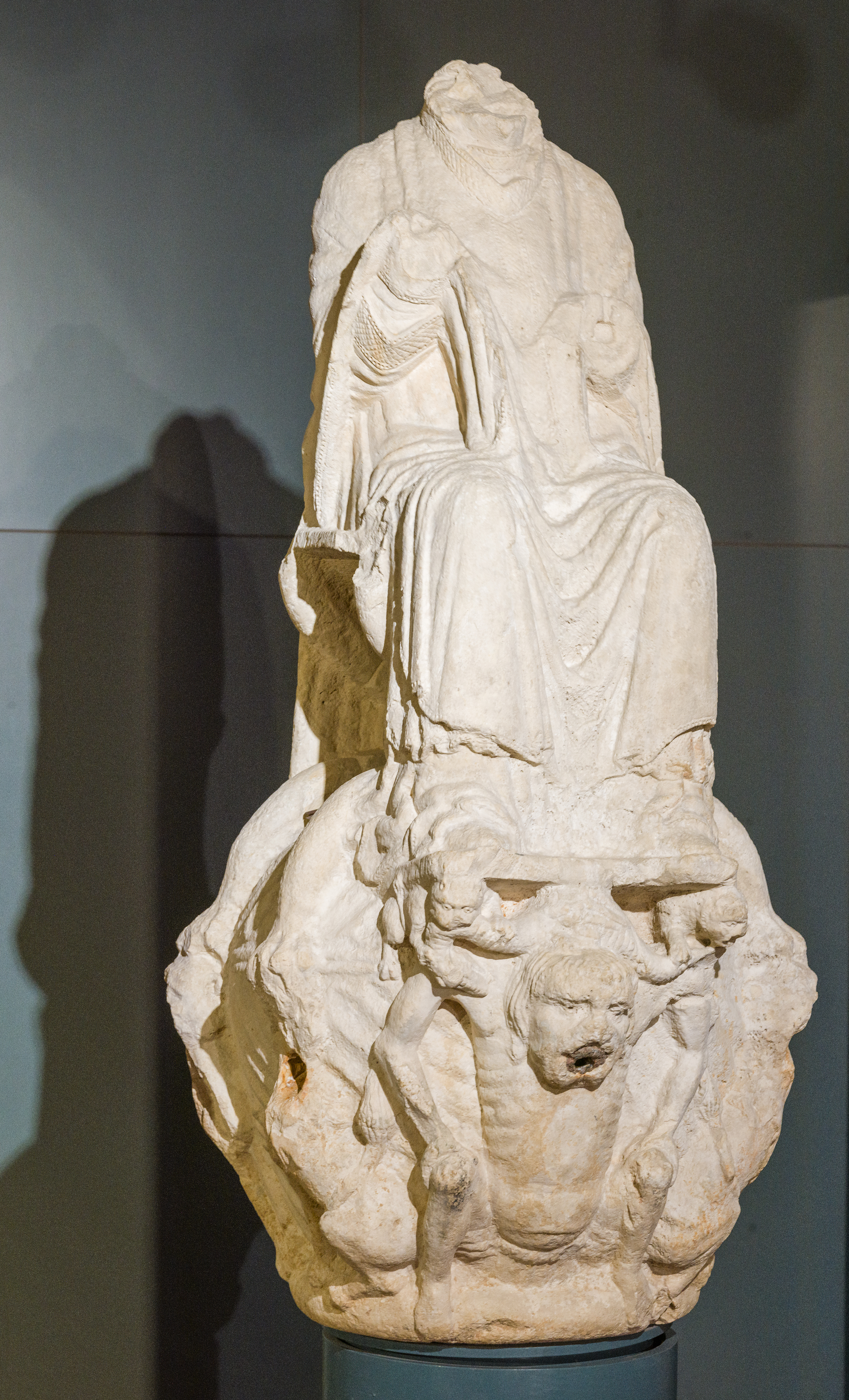
The monument to Berardo Maggi preserved in the museum of Santa Giulia

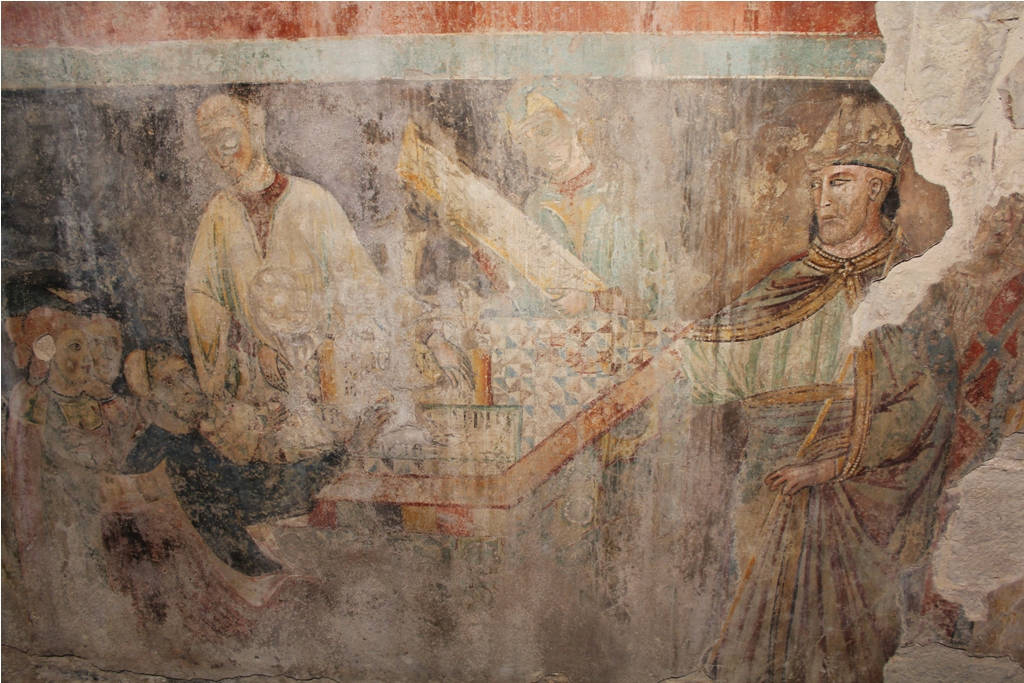
Berardo Maggi's peace depicted in the Knights' Hall in the town hall

The aforementioned body of Maggi is depicted at this juncture in the typical attire of a high prelate: diaconal (dalmatic and maniple), sacerdotal (chasuble and humeral) and even pontifical (episcopal gloves, mitre, ring and crosier) regalia; the corpse also does not have its arms crossed but rather displays a blessing attitude with its right hand; (Note: Recurring iconography in many representations of the bishop: in the peace scene of the tomb, as well as in the fresco of the town hall and the fountain statue preserved in the Museum of Santa Giulia.) a gesture, the latter, quite unusual in the typology of Italian episcopal tombs, where the hands are usually crossed at the waist. Perhaps the inspiration for this anomalous iconography, namely the depiction with the right hand blessing, may have been borrowed from transalpine models. The bishop's head, then, rests on a tasseled pillow and the eyes are closed.

The realism of the face, as well as the wrinkled forehead, the almost sagging cheeks, and the wrinkles around the eyes, render a much more detailed portrait of Maggi than the depiction of the Peace placed in the city's town hall: based on these details, perhaps, the figure of the ark would have been made on the model of a death mask, or, even, by observing de visu the corpse of Maggi. The same realistic component of the somatic features already mentioned, moreover, is very similar to that found in the funeral monument to Cardinal Guglielmo Longhi, preserved in the basilica of Santa Maria Maggiore in Bergamo.

In the upper part of the flap, in the background and parallel to the apex of the lid and along its entire length, is narrated the scene of the Obsequies; the latter is dominated by a complex theory of figures, bordered at each end by a pair of candelabra, in turn flanked by a processional cross pattée for each and supported by clerics, oriented toward the center of the scene. (Note: Regarding crosses and processional crosses, artifacts particularly characteristic of Brescia, see both Cupperi (2000, p. 407), note 70, in relation especially to crosses pattées, as well as Stroppa (2017, p. 173), note 76. Among the examples of crosses pattées in Brescia is the cross of Desiderius, an 8th-century artifact. The crosses depicted on Maggi's sarcophagus, however, do not resemble that of Desiderius but rather the so-called Cross of the Field. Beyond the normal devotion to these sacred objects, it is worth mentioning the special importance in Brescia of the Treasure of the Holy Crosses, composed of various relics and objects of goldsmith's art, highly venerated in the city context.) The array in question, characterized by an articulated structure, is interesting for the purpose of understanding the symbolic and iconographic framing of the effigy; it can be divided into groups and, read from left to right, appear:

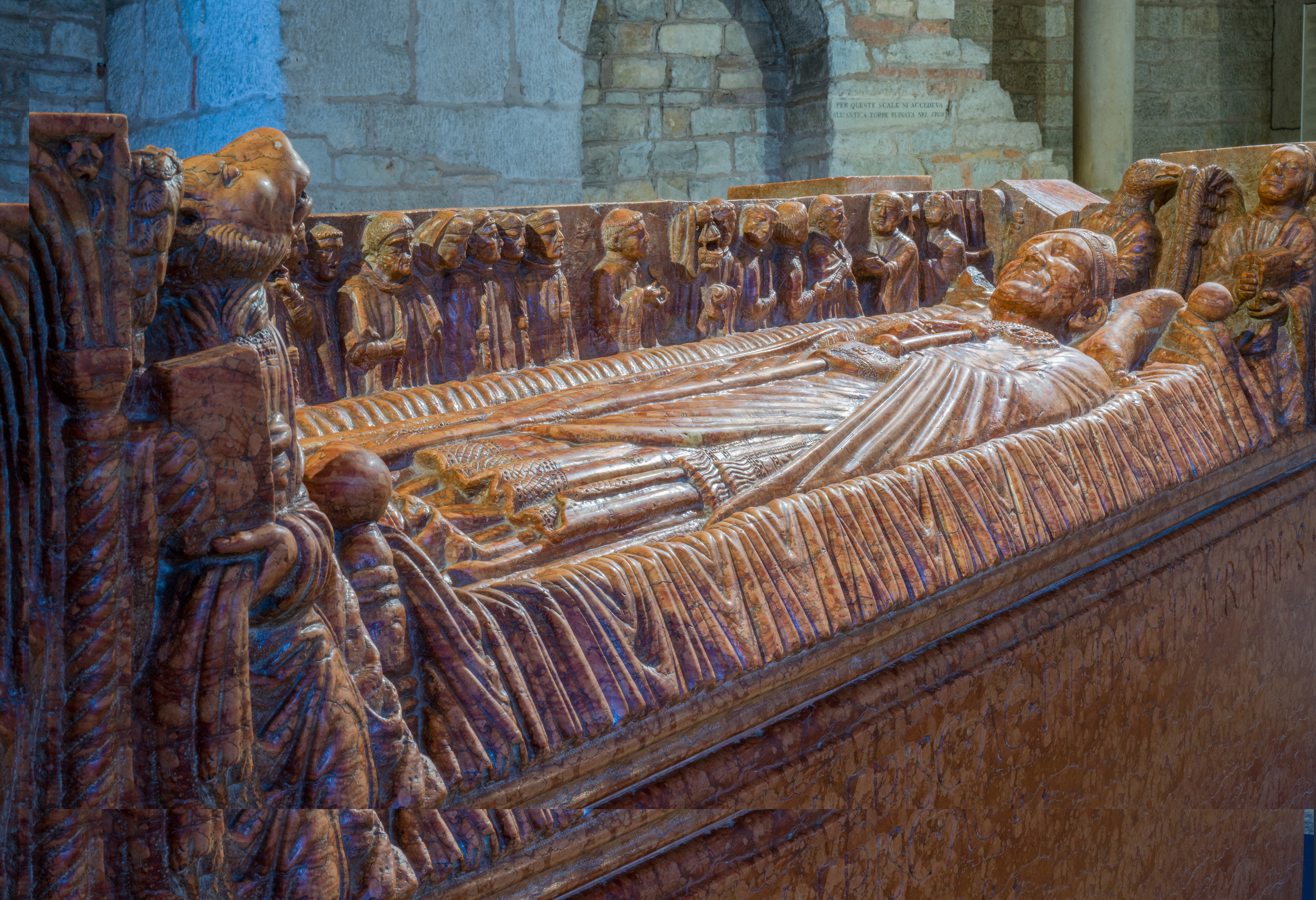
Maggi's body

1. Five figures of ecclesiastics, distinguishable by the so-called biretus and cape they wear and likely canons, abbots, clerics and provosts, placed at Maggi's feet. They are depicted praying and holding candelabra in their hands; they may be considered, in all likelihood, either members of the cathedral chapter or abbots of the various city monasteries; in the background are distinguished, with simple tonsure to indicate their lower rank, two open-mouthed cantores in a praying attitude.
2. Another five figures of clerics, probably canons, this time portrayed in a more reserved and composed attitude. In the center of the fifth the context changes, both because of the presence of new figures and because of a general sense of different motion, more evident in fact than in the previous section. Two other tonsured clerics, in fact, patiently await the preparations to incense Maggi's body: the incense in the meantime is extracted from an incense boat by the incensarius, (Note: The type of incense boat depicted at this juncture is the oldest, that is, almond-shaped, and was still in use during the thirteenth century. The lid is in fact open for the entire length of the bowl and articulated outward on a single hinge) that is, the leftmost cleric, flanked in turn by a turiferarius; the latter brings a spherical thurible close to his face by means of his right hand, blowing into it probably to rekindle its embers. In his left hand he holds bundles containing the psalms to be recited in the service. All the figures depicted at this juncture, however, are clearly identifiable and distinguishable by the liturgical vestments with which they are endowed, namely the tunic and the superpelliceum, which in fact clearly denote the liturgical tasks for which they are destined, though they do not make explicit their episcopal rank.
3. Two deacons, a priest, and a cleric appear in this section in a much more dilated and abundant space than the other figures, both to further emphasize the roles of each and to catalyze the viewer's attention to the face of Maggi, the true subject of the ceremony and the scene. (Note: Deacons are clearly distinguished by the type of vestment they wear, inspired by the Ambrosian rite: a stole worn across the chest with a collared humeral.) The first deacon from the left holds a sacramentary and seems to be attentively observing the work of the nearby turiferarius; the second, on the other hand, holds the flap of the mantle of the officiant at the rite, who, elderly and already engaged in raising the aspergillum, immerses the same instrument in the basin, supported in the meantime by the last deacon.

==== Symbolic and figurative language of the scene ====
Both the division of the host into groups, already pointed out in the opening, and the hierarchy outlined in the theory of characters and their cohesiveness in different stances and dynamics, express the exceptionality of the scene: an absolutely uncommon funeral rite, both because of the sumptuousness of the ceremony and because of the presence of relatives of the deceased and members of the same pars ecclesiae. (Note: In fact, the rule in the funeral statutes that laymen and relatives of the deceased could not take part in the funeral should be noted; however, it is known that the young Federico Maggi was already a member of the cathedral chapter in 1308. For further study see Cupperi (2000, pp. 408–409), note 76) Moreover, the scene of the funeral procession, opened and closed by a module of clerics with processional cross and candelabra, suggests a circular, ring-like structure, which symbolically alludes to the Rotonda, Brescia's urban matrix.

The dense iconographic apparatus of this flap, then, seems to imbue on the whole a highly sophisticated and refined symbolic language, all the more so because it is closely related to the other side of the lid: the physical space in which the funeral scene takes place, in all probability, can be identified as the chancel, in front of the apsidal basin and the high altar; this scenario is in fact reported at the same height in the other effigy, where the peace scene is depicted, signifying an iconographic language of the highest refinement that unites two opposite depictions, at the same time linked together. This clear correlation along with the contrast echoes the all-encompassing image of Maggi, who was in fact able to synthesize the figures of spiritual and temporal leadership equally; the two flaps of the lid, in this sense, brilliantly express the dual nature of Berardo's lordship, who was both bishop and lord of Brescia.

== See also ==
- Old Cathedral, Brescia

== Bibliography ==
Old sources

- Baldassarre Zamboni. Memorie intorno alle pubbliche fabbriche più insigni della città di Brescia. Raccolte da Baldassarre Zamboni Arciprete di Calvisano. Brescia: Pietro Vescovi.
- Camillo Maggi. Historia Camilli de Maggis patricii Brixie de rebus patriae. Brescia.
- Federico Odorici (1856). Storie bresciane dai primi tempi sino all'età nostra. Vol. VI. Brescia.
- Nicolò Bettoni, ed. (1822). Le tombe ed i monumenti illustri d'Italia, descritti e delineati con tavole in rame. Milano. pp. 242–248.
- Federico Odorici (1853). Guida di Brescia: Rapporto alle arti ed ai monumenti antichi e moderni. Brescia: per Francesco Cavalieri.

Modern sources

- Giorgio Nicodemi (1924). "L'arca di Bernardo Maggi nel duomo vecchio di Brescia". Dedalo. I (V): 147–155.
- Francesca Stroppa (2017). "A proposito della propaganda episcopale di Berardo Maggi". Memorie storiche della diocesi di Brescia (PDF). Brescia: Studium. pp. 123–233.
- Elizabeth Freeman (October 2007). "La tomba di Berardo Maggi a Brescia. Per una rilettura del messaggio politico di un mausoleo episcopale all'inizio del Trecento" (PDF). Civiltà bresciana (4): 7–35. ISSN 1122-2387.
- Walter Cupperi, ed. (2012). Cum multa de illarum figurarum narraret, Il Maestro di Santa Anastasia e la visibilità delle stele funerarie romane tra Brescia e Verona nel primo Trecento (PDF). Brescia: Fondazione Civiltà Bresciana. pp. 245–280.
- Antonio Fappani, ed. (1991). "MAGGI Berardo". Enciclopedia Bresciana. 8. Brescia: La Voce del Popolo. OCLC 163182000.
- Anna Sgarella (January 2013). "I riflessi della scultura veronese del Trecento sulla produzione scultorea di Andriolo de' Santi". Commentari d'arte (54–55). De Luca editori d'arte: 45–53.
- Gian Maria Varanini (2006). "Berardo Maggi". Dizionario Biografico degli Italiani (in Italian). Vol. 67: Macchi–Malaspina. Rome: Istituto dell'Enciclopedia Italiana. ISBN 978-88-12-00032-6.
- Walter Cupperi (2000). "Il Sarcofago di Berardo Maggi, Signore e Vescovo di Brescia, E La Questione Dei Suoi Ritratti Trecenteschi: Tradizioni episcopali, iconografie cerimoniali, contesto civico e circolazione regionale". Annali della Scuola Normale Superiore di Pisa. Classe di Lettere e Filosofia. 5 (2). Pisa: 387–438. JSTOR 24308347.
- Matteo Ferrari (2013). I Maggi a Brescia: politica e immagine di una 'signoria' (1275-1316) (PDF). Scuola Normale Superiore. pp. 32–66. ISSN 2036-8755.
- Gabriele Archetti (1994). "Immagine e memoria di un episcopato nell'iconografia del sarcofago Maggi (sec. XIV)" (PDF). Supplemento AI Commentari dell'Ateneo di Brescia per l'Anno 1994. Brescia: Stamperia fratelli Geroldi: 117–137.
- Jean-François Sonnay (1990). "Paix et bon gouvernement: A propos d'un monument funéraire du Trecento". Arte Medievale. II (2): 179–191. ISSN 0393-7267.
- V. Terraroli (1987). Luigi Arcioni e i restauri ottocenteschi alla Rotonda: storia e problematiche di un intervento. Brescia: Grafo. OCLC 745960752.
- Marco Rossi (2005). A. C. Quintavalle (ed.). L'immagine della Pace nel monumento funerario di Berardo Maggi, vescovo e signore di Brescia. Parma: Electa. pp. 588–596. OCLC 1105003540.
- Gabriele Archetti (1994). Berardo Maggi vescovo e signore di Brescia. Studi sulle istituzioni ecclesiastiche e sociali della Lombardia orientale tra tredicesimo e quattordicesimo secolo. Brescia: Fondazione Civiltà Bresciana. OCLC 48063939.
