= Christ with the Eucharist and Saints Cosmas and Damian =

Painting by Moretto da Brescia

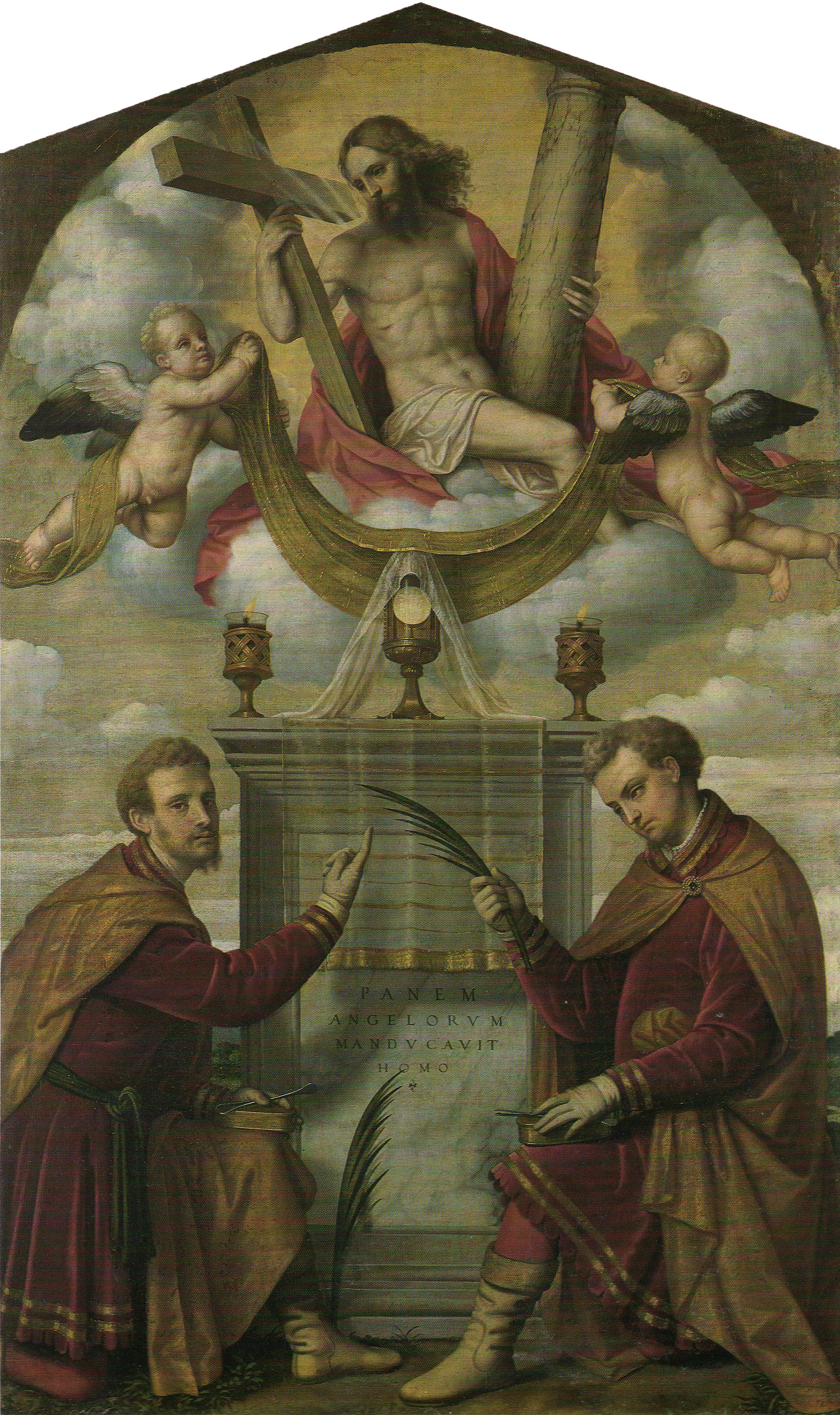
Christ with the Eucharist and Saints Cosmas and Damian (c. 1540) by Moretto da Brescia

Christ with the Eucharist and Saints Cosmas and Damian is an oil on canvas painting by Moretto da Brescia, executed c. 1540, still in the church dedicated to the two saints in Marmentino and now on its high altar.

A late work, it supports the idea of transubstantiation, then as now disputed by the Protestant church It was probably commissioned by Donato Savallo, archpriest of the Basilica of San Pietro de Dom from 1524 onwards and linked to the parish benefices in Marmentino (held by him from 1522 to 1551) and Castenedolo, site of Moretto's similar Christ with the Eucharist and Saints Bartholomew and Roch Savallo wrote to Moretto in 1530 about the organist Graziadio Antegnati, though this is too long before the probable date of the painting to firmly ascribe the commission.
