= Christ with the Eucharist and Saints Bartholomew and Roch =

Painting by Moretto da Brescia

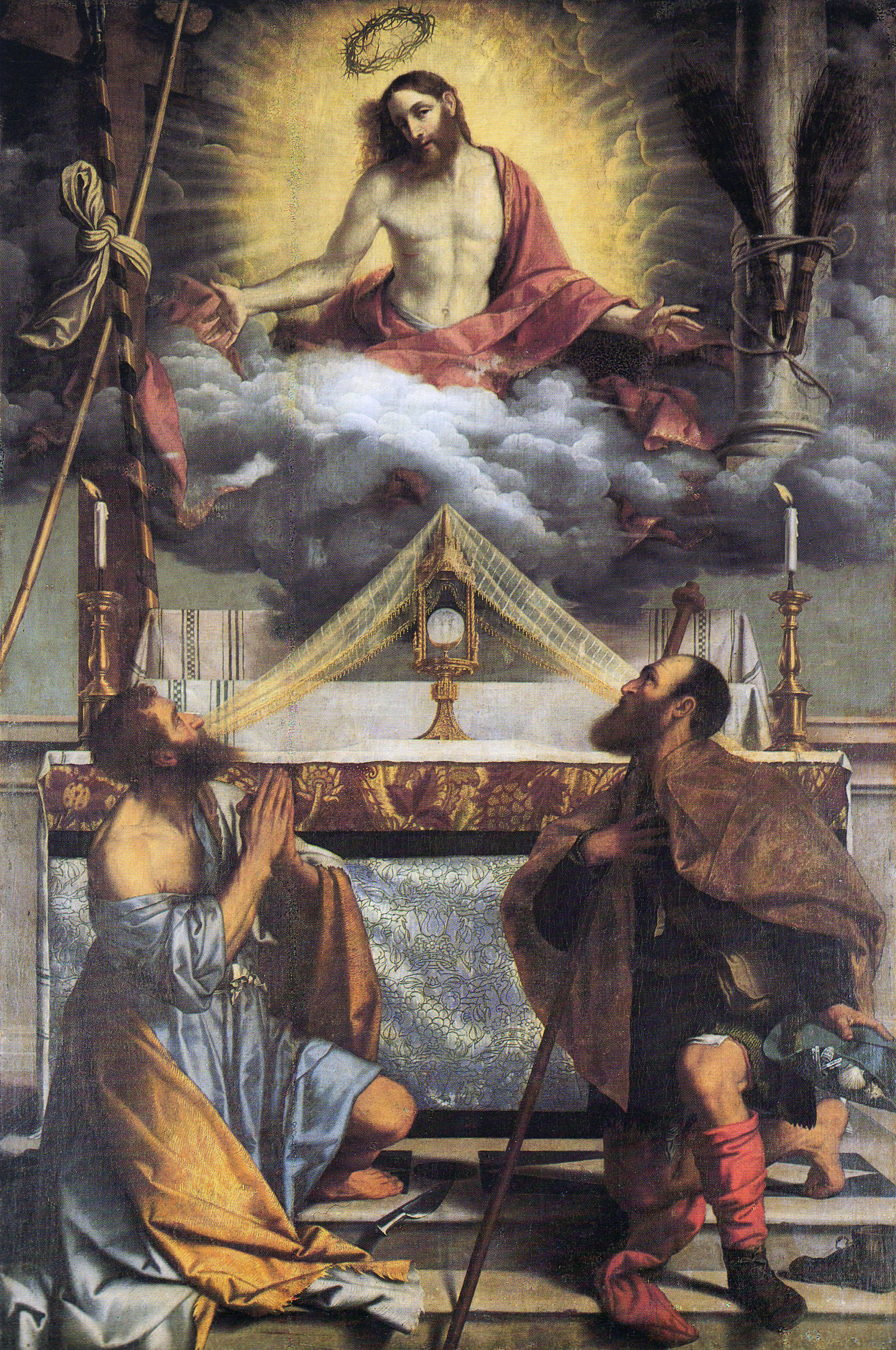
Christ with the Eucharist and Saints Bartholomew and Roch (c. 1545) by Moretto da Brescia

Christ with the Eucharist and Saints Bartholomew and Roch is an oil on canvas painting by Moretto da Brescia, executed c. 1545, still in the church of San Bartolomeo in Castenedolo in the Province of Brescia, Italy.

A late work, it supports the idea of transubstantiation, then as now disputed by the Protestant church It was probably commissioned by Donato Savallo, archpriest of the Basilica of San Pietro de Dom from 1524 onwards and linked to the parish benefices in Castenedolo and Marmentino (held by him from 1522 to 1551 and the location of Moretto's similar Christ with the Eucharist and Saints Cosmas and Damian Savallo wrote to Moretto in 1530 about the organist Graziadio Antegnati, though this is too long before the probable date of either of the two paintings to firmly ascribe the commission to Savallo.
