= Old Cathedral, Brescia =

Cathedral in Brescia, Italy

Coordinates: 45.5383°N 10.2215°E

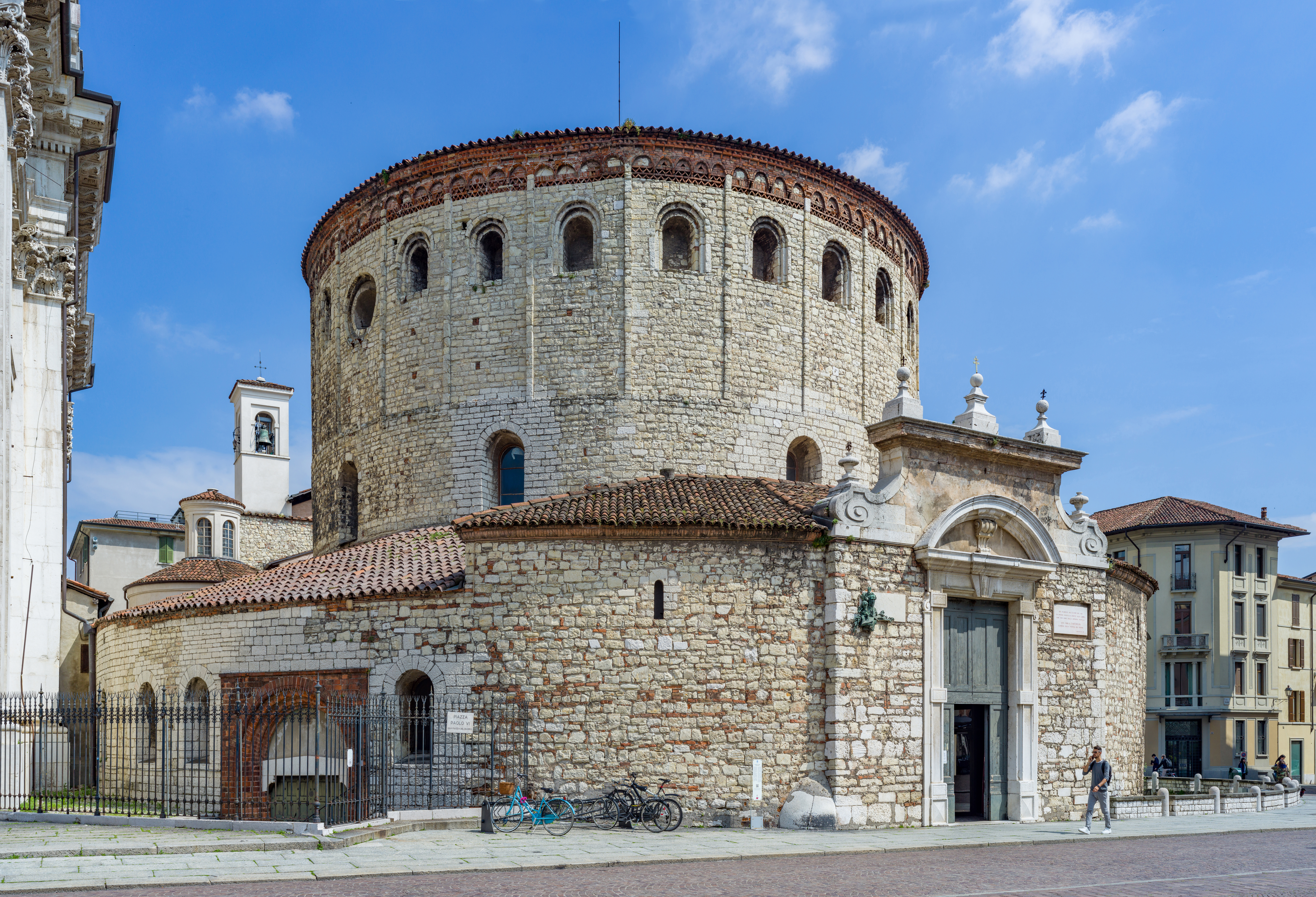
The exterior of the cathedral

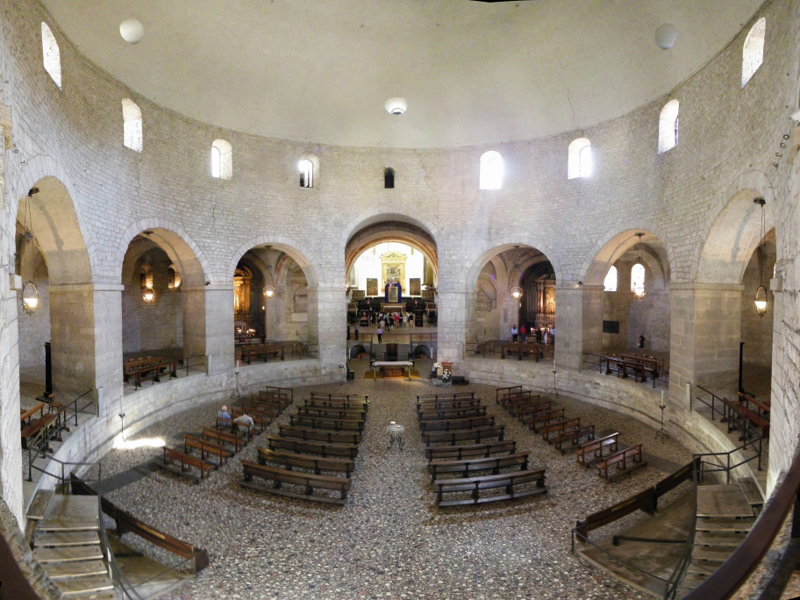
Interior view of the cathedral

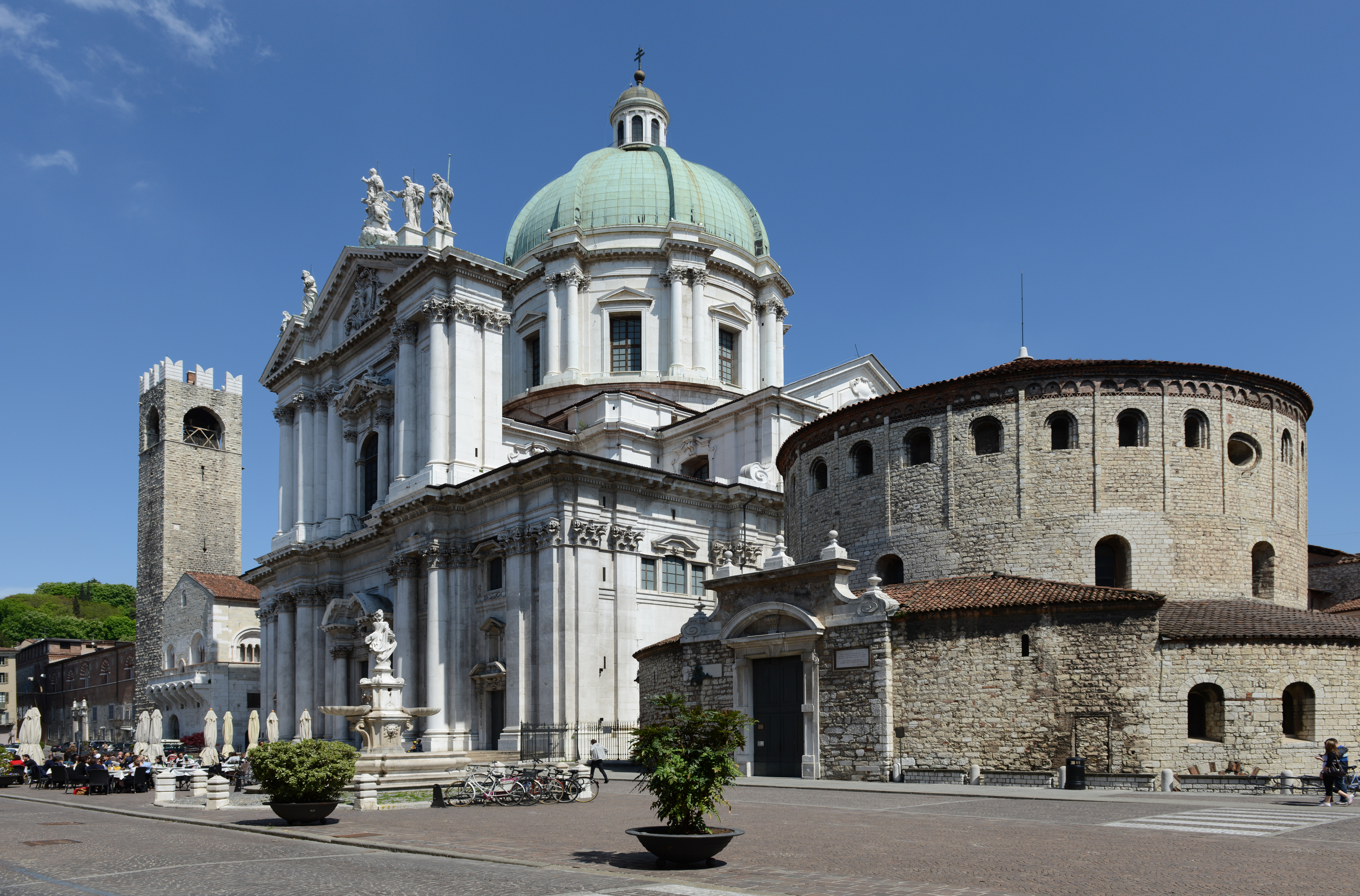
New and Old Cathedrals of Brescia

The Duomo Vecchio or Old Cathedral (also called "La Rotonda" because of its round layout) is a Roman Catholic church in Brescia, Italy; the rustic circular Romanesque co-cathedral stands next to the Duomo Nuovo (New Cathedral) of Brescia. It is officially known as the Winter Co-Cathedral of Santa Maria Assunta, while the adjacent main cathedral is known as the Summer Cathedral.

It is one of the most important examples of Romanesque round church in Italy.

While some claims for an earlier construction exist, the earliest documents state that construction of the cathedral started about 1100 on the site of a prior church with a basilica layout. It has a circular shape that became rare after the Council of Trent, and is one of the most prominent round churches of the period still remaining. There are 13th century frescoes on the interior walls, and a large canvas by Francesco Maffei showing the church with a bell tower, which has since collapsed.

In the 19th century, many additions to the original medieval building were removed. The entrance portal is one later addition remaining. It contains the medieval Crypt of San Filastrio, in honor of the beatified Brescian bishop.

Near the entrance, rests the sarcophagus of Bishop Berardo Maggi (1308) made of red marble. The Duomo Vecchio contains l'Assunta (1526) and St. Luke, St. Mark and the sleeping Elijah (1533–1534) by Moretto da Brescia. It contains a Gathering Manna by Gerolamo Romanino and a Translation of the Bodies of Saints by Francesco Maffei.

== See also ==
- High medieval domes
- Treasure of the Holy Crosses
