= Philastrius =

Bishop of Brescia

Saint Philastrius
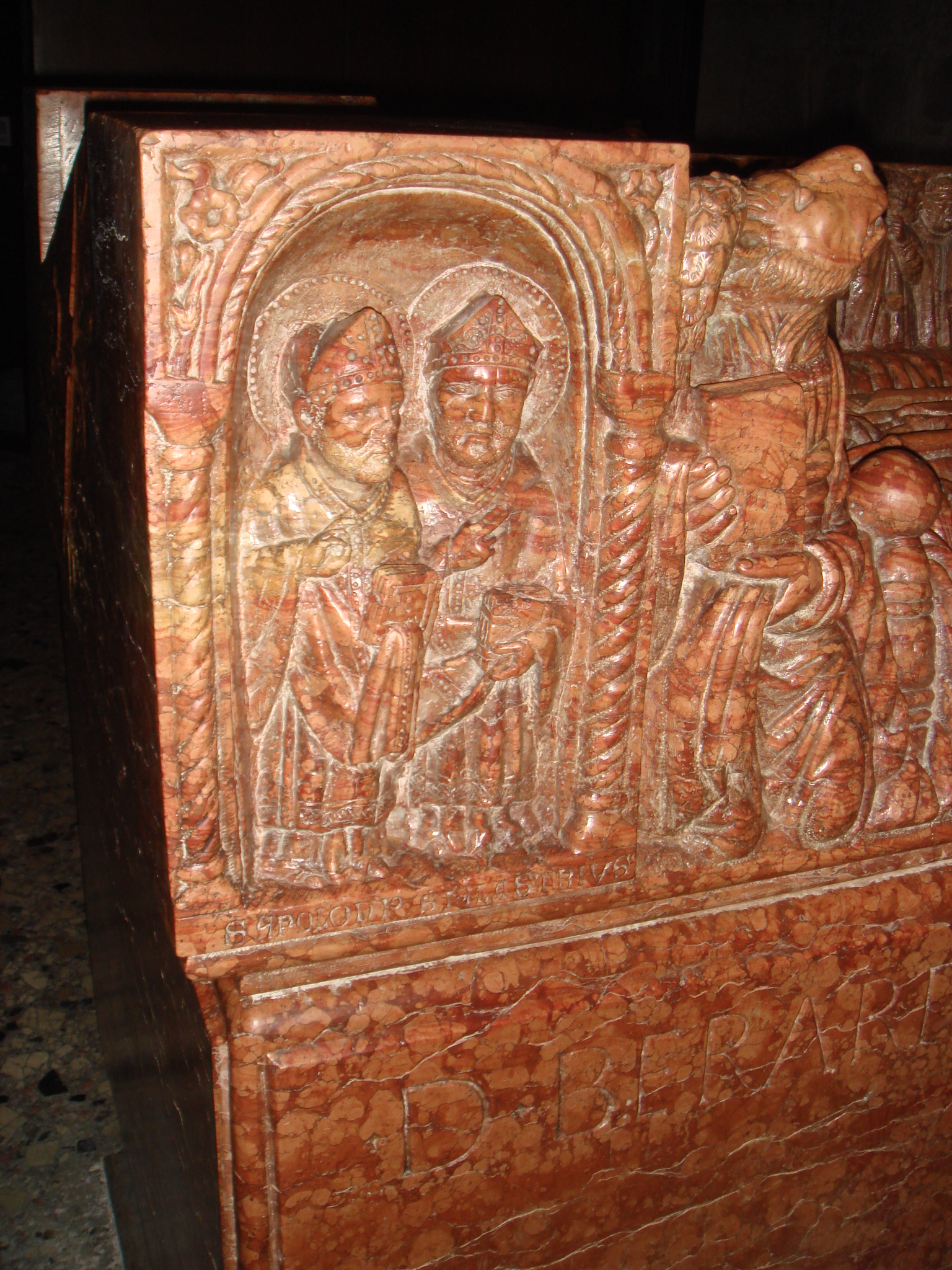
- The holy bishops Apollonius and Philaster. Detail of the sarcophagus of Bishop Berardo Maggi
- Died: ~387 AD
- Venerated in: Catholic Church
- Feast: July 18

Philastrius (also Philaster or Filaster) Bishop of Brescia, was one of the bishops present at a synod held in Aquileia in 381.

== Life ==
Philastrius was born around 330 and ordained at the age of 30. Hagiographical accounts describe him as leaving his homeland and family inheritance to devote himself fully to religious life and liken his departure to that of Abraham.

He traveled extensively throughout the Roman world and preached against pagans and heretics, particularly the Arians. In Milan, he became a significant supporter of the Catholic faction during the tenure of Ambrose's Arian predecessor, Auxentius. Augustine of Hippo met him in Milan around 383 or shortly thereafter. At Rome, he held both private and public disputations with heretics and reportedly converted many individuals.

His travels ended when he was appointed Bishop of Brescia. He died sometime before 387 and was buried in the ancient Cathedral of St Andrew at Brescia. The Catholic Church venerates him as a saint, with his feast day observed on 18 July, as recorded in the latest official edition of the Roman Martyrology.

== Historical evidence ==
Among the writings of Gaudentius of Brescia was a sermon purporting to be preached on the fourteenth anniversary of Philastrius's death. Historians such as Louis Ellies du Pin have questioned the genuineness of the sermon. Friedrich Marx thought the sermon a forgery of the eighth or ninth century. The chief objection to its genuineness, rather a weak one, seems to be that it is not found in the manuscripts containing the undoubted sermons of Gaudentius. Marx was answered by Knappe, "Ist die 21 Rede des hl. Gaudentius (Oratio B. Gaudentii de Vita et Obitu B. Filastrii episcopi prædecessoris sui) echt? Zugleich ein Betrag zur Latinität des Gaudentius" (Osnabrück), who endeavoured to prove the genuineness of the sermon in question by linguistic arguments. His Bollandist reviewer thought he has made a strong case (Anal. Boll., XXVIII, 224).

== Works ==
Philastrius composed a catalogue of heresies (Diversarum Hereseon Liber) about 384. Richard Adelbert Lipsius discovered that in Philastrius's "Catalogue" of heresies, for the Christian heresies up to Noetus, the compiler drew from the same source as Epiphanius of Salamis: the lost Syntagma of Hippolytus. By the aid, therefore, of these two and the Pseudo-Tertullian Adversus Omnes Haereses, it has been possible in great measure to reconstruct the lost treatise of Hippolytus.

Philastrius' comments and spellings do not always accord with those of Epiphanius or Pseudo-Tertullian, for example his description of Nazaraei does not match well with either the Nasaraioi or Nazoraioi which Epiphanius attempts to distinguish.

== Editions ==
- The first edition of the "Catalogue" was published at Basle (1528)
- Friedrich Marx, Philastrius (Vienna, 1898) in the Corp. Script. Eccl. Lat.
- Gabriele Banterle, translator, (1991, Rome) San Filastrio di Brescia, Delle varie eresie / San Gaudenzio di Brescia, Trattati
