= Basilica of San Pietro de Dom =

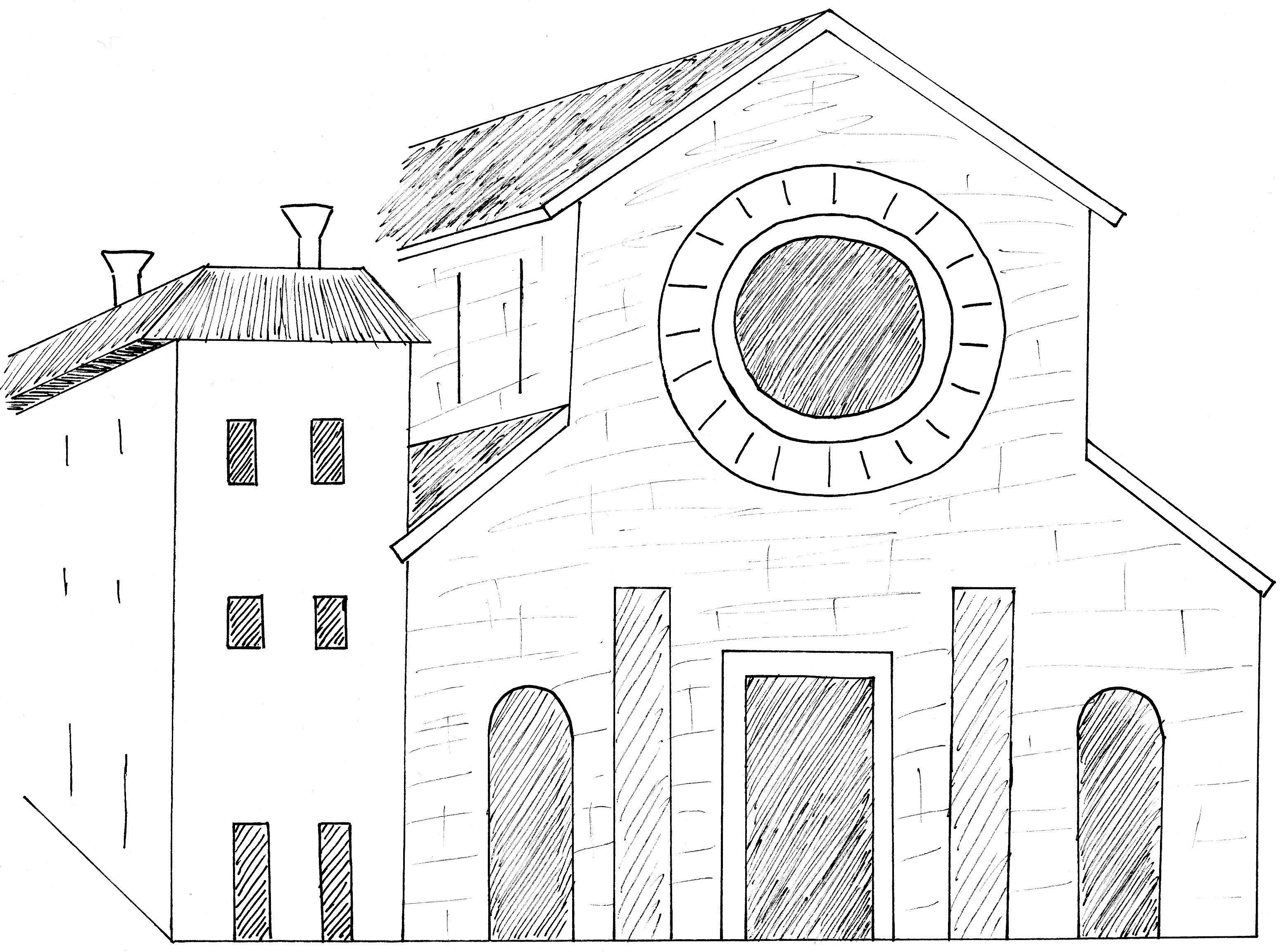
- Speculative facade based on miniature model of 1588
- Basilica of San Pietro de Dom
- 45°32′19″N 10°13′18″E
- Country: Italy
- Denomination: Roman Catholic

Architecture
- Architectural type: Early Christian
- Years built: 7th century
- Demolished: 1603

Administration
- Archdiocese: Diocese of Brescia

The Basilica of San Pietro de Dom was a church in Brescia built in the early Christian era on the east side of the Piazza del Duomo. After numerous mishaps, it was demolished at the beginning of the seventeenth century to build the New Cathedral.

== History ==
The Basilica of San Pietro (St Peter) de Dom was Brescia's summer cathedral, in contrast to the adjacent Basilica of Santa Maria Maggiore de Dom, the winter cathedral. The appellation de Dom comes from the episcopal domus, where the bishop resided with the urban clergy, still identifiable in the Via Mazzini directly behind the cathedrals.

The origins of the basilica are virtually unknown, being nearly absent from early chronicles. However, some surviving writings give a brief description. Baldassare Zamboni's chronicle published in 1778 but written at the end of the 16th century affirms that the basilica was built in the 7th century and that, over the centuries, suffered various mishaps, including fires and careless restorations. In the year 800, for example, the consistency of its walls was undermined by fire; in 1096, another devastating fire affected the area of the square as well as the nearby quarter of Porta Bruciata (burned gate) which then took on that name. There were also two earthquakes, in 1117 and 1142.

Based on the use of Roman elements in its construction as well as the basilical form, Panazza avers that the church originates between the sixth and eighth centuries, when the builders used ancient materials found on the spot.

The basilica was a small building, surrounded by others to the north (on today's Via Querini) and to the east (on Via Mazzini). The interior had a lower floor than that of the square, in common with churches of antiquity, and had three naves, divided by two colonnades with fourteen columns each. The columns were of varying height, diameter, material and colour: some were of somewhat veined white marble while others were of the colour of iron (likely granite). The capitals and architraves were bare, possibly reused from the area of the ancient Roman Forum of Brescia.

Between 1571 and 1581, the edifice underwent extensive renovation: the floor was raised to the level of the square, windows were installed and a new roof with a false ceiling created. The works were conducted by an architect, Giovanni Maria Piantavigna. The building did not survive very long thereafter: it was structurally unstable and deteriorating, and within about twenty years, it was demolished to allow the construction of a larger church, the New Cathedral, which was more in line with the aesthetic of the period.

== Architectural sources ==
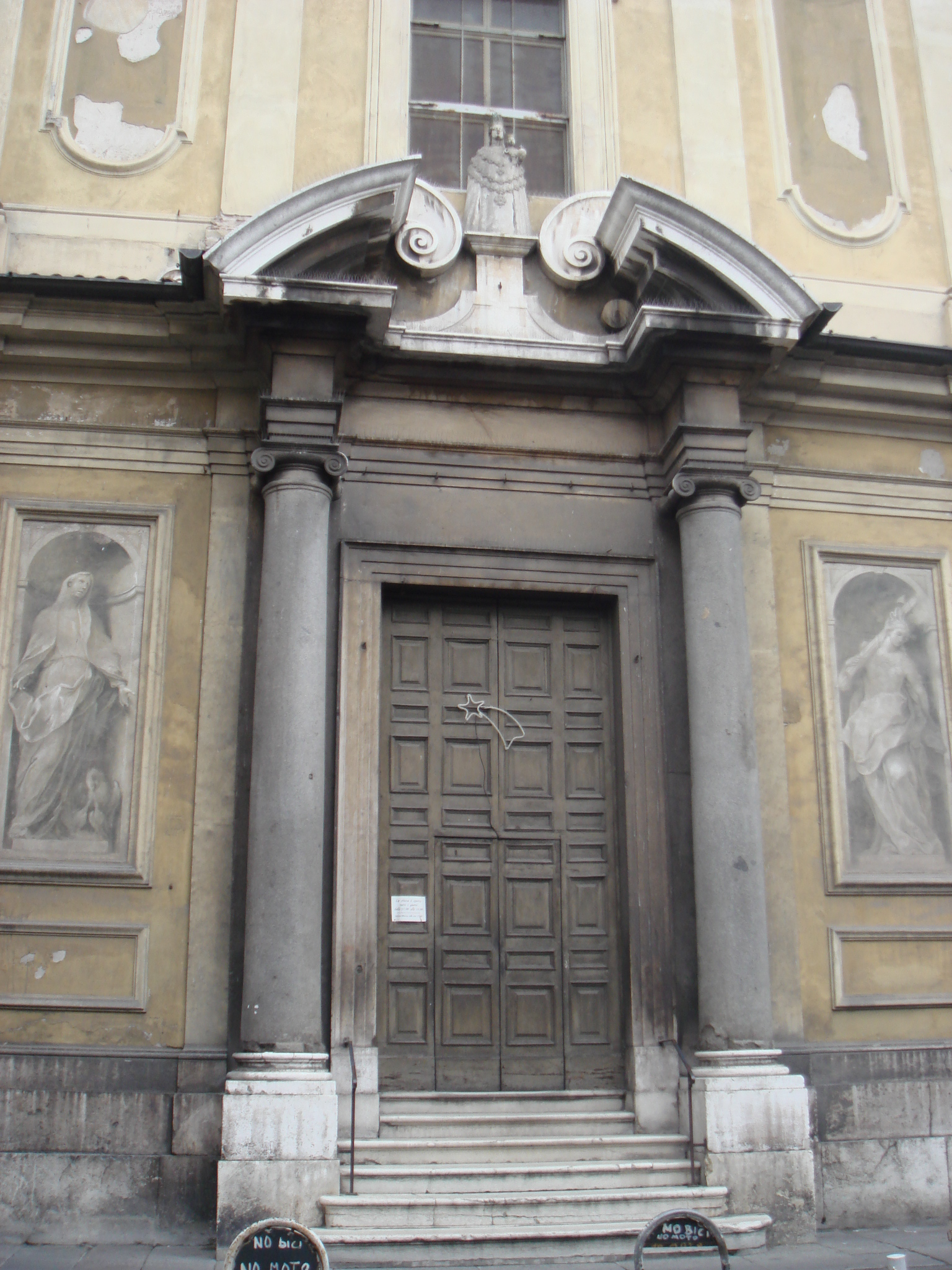
Entrance to the Santa Maria della Carità showing two columns from the Basilica of San Pietro de Dom

To date there are only two historically reliable and sufficiently clear depictions of the basilica. The first is the miniature on the cover of the Estimo della città di Brescia of 1588, which depicted the eastern side of the Piazza del Duomo, showing the Broletto palace with the Torre del Popolo tower, the Old Cathedral with its campanile (which collapsed in the 18th century), and the basilica itself in an emerging central body with two lower side aisles covered by sloping roofs. A roseate window appears in the upper middle, while below, the entrance portal opens. The building does not quite abut the street (today's Via Querini) but is separated by a set of houses.

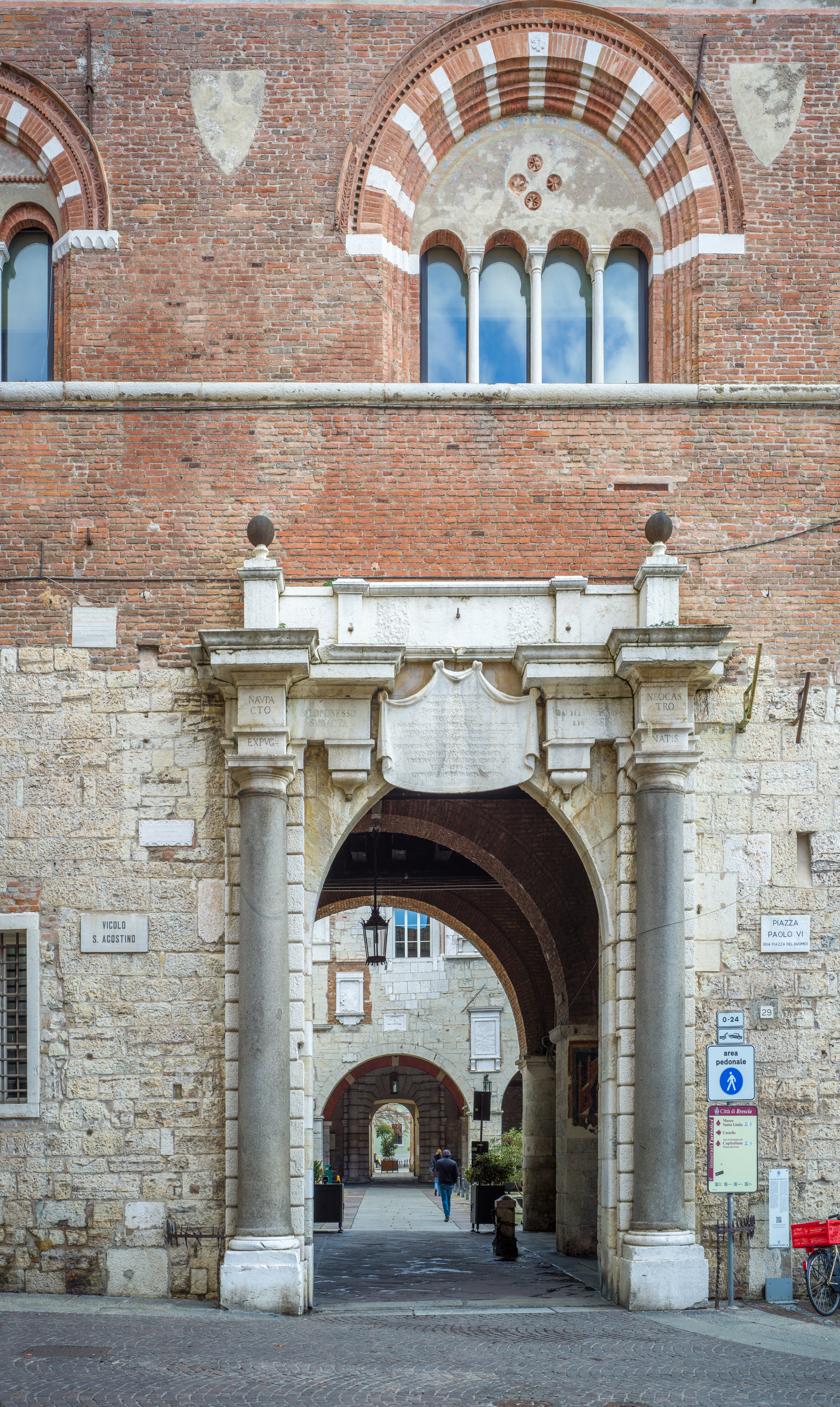
The Broletto gate with columns from the basilica

The second testimony is Giovanni Antonio Avanzo's plan from 1601 to provide precise areas and measurements for the new cathedral's construction. The drawing shows the plan of the basilica, confirming the three naves. The measurements are in Brescian fathoms (about half a metre).

These illustrations are reproduced in Panazza's 1942 book.

Other sources show images of the church, often from a bird's eye view, but do not give additional detail beyond those from the aforementioned documents. An example is the Francesco Maffei painting Transporting the reliquaries of the Brescian saints Anastasio, Dominatore, Paolo and Domenico (currently in the Old Cathedral), where one can see the basilica's facade with the roseate window, as well as the south side with its series of arches typical of the period. A Pompeo Ghitti painting Beato Bernardino da Feltre istituisce a Brescia le scuole del SS. Sacramento (preserved in the Church of Santa Maria in Calchera) shows the old Piazza del Duomo with the basilica in the background, though no further detail can be elicited from it to reconstruct the basilica's appearance.

Only a small part of the columns remain of the basilica. These originated in the Roman era and comprised the colonnade between the main and the two side aisles: monolithic columns of dark Egyptian marble, described by Zamboni as coloured like iron. They are about 5 metres tall, smooth and unfinished. Recovered from the demolition of the basilica, they have been reused in other monuments: two in the entrance to the Broletto, two for the entrance to the Church of Santa Maria della Carità, and six in the front-yard for the Villa Mazzucchelli in Ciliverghe.

== Art in the Basilica ==
Two surviving artworks are known to have adumbrated the basilica. One is Vincenzo Foppa's Polyptych of the Blessed Sacrament of 1501, first situated in the chapel of the Blessed Sacrament and later moved to the high altar of the basilica. The other is Francesco Giolfino's Crucifix of the New Cathedral (1502), which today is in the first altar on the right hand side of the New Cathedral.

The central nave of the basilica was decorated by Tommaso Bona with Pietro Marone in 1581, but this work was lost with the basilica's demolition.

The basilica was also known for its music, with an organ and complete orchestra in place. The monks attached to the basilica were closely tied to the Brescian viol-makers, and are known to have patronised Gasparo da Salò, a famed viol-maker.

== Bibliography ==
- Begni Redona, Pier Virgilio (2004). "Quattrocento anni di storia dell'arte a Brescia - Pittura e scultura nel Duomo nuovo". In Taccolini, Marco (ed.). Il Duomo nuovo di Brescia - Quattro secoli di arte, storia, fede. Brescia: Grafo.
- Cantù, Cesare (1858). Grande illustrazione del Lombardo-Veneto: ossia storia delle città, dei borghi, comuni, castelli, ecc. : fino ai tempi moderni. Vol. 3.
- Guerrini, Paolo (1986). Santuari, chiese, conventi. Brescia: Edizioni del Moretto.
- Haweis, Hugh Reginald (1898). Old violins and violin lore.
- Panazza, Gaetano (1942). L'arte medioevale nel territoria Bresciano (PDF). Ateneo di Brescia.
- Simoni, Piero (1994). "La casa ex-Alberghini a Gavardo esempio notevole di architettura civile del secolo XV" (PDF). In Vaglia, Ugo (ed.). Scritti in onore di Gaetano Panazza. Ateneo di Brescia.
- Zamboni, Baldassarre (1778). Memorie intorno alle fabbriche più insigni della città di Brescia. Brescia.
- Lombardia. Touring Club Italiano. 1999. ISBN 9788836513253.
