= New Cathedral, Brescia =

Church in Brescia, Italy

Coordinates: 45°32′19″N 10°13′19″E

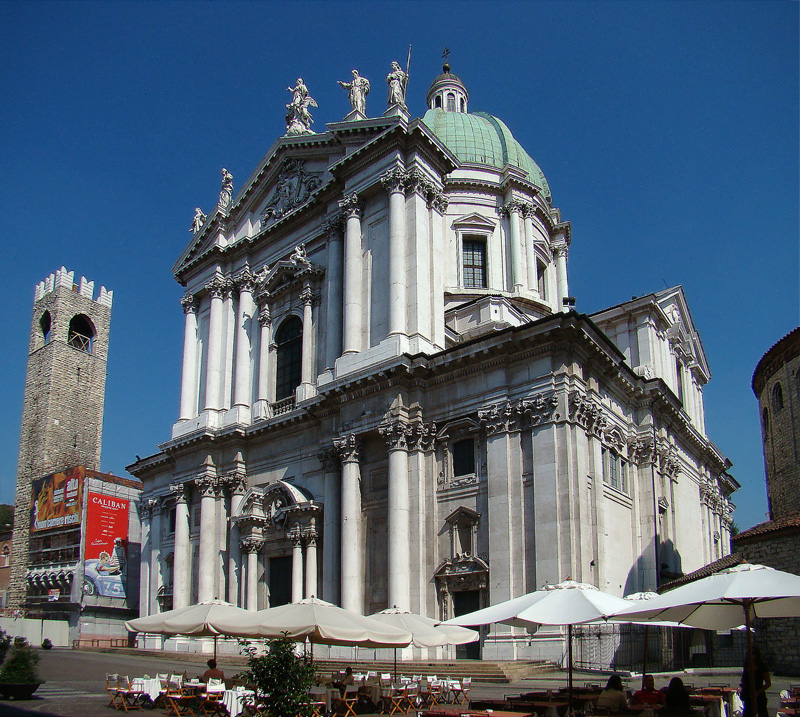
Duomo Nuovo: facade

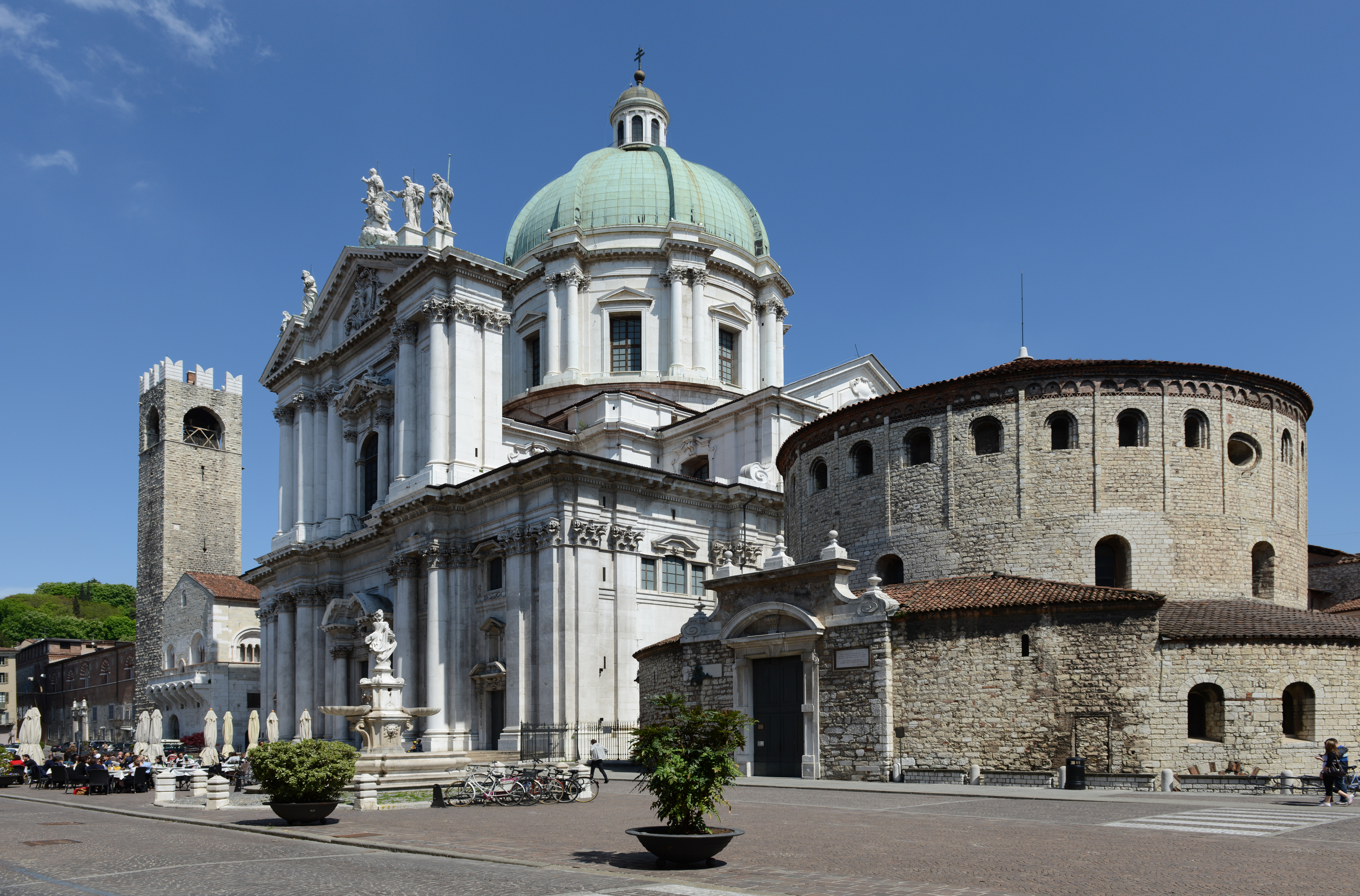
New and old cathedrals of Brescia

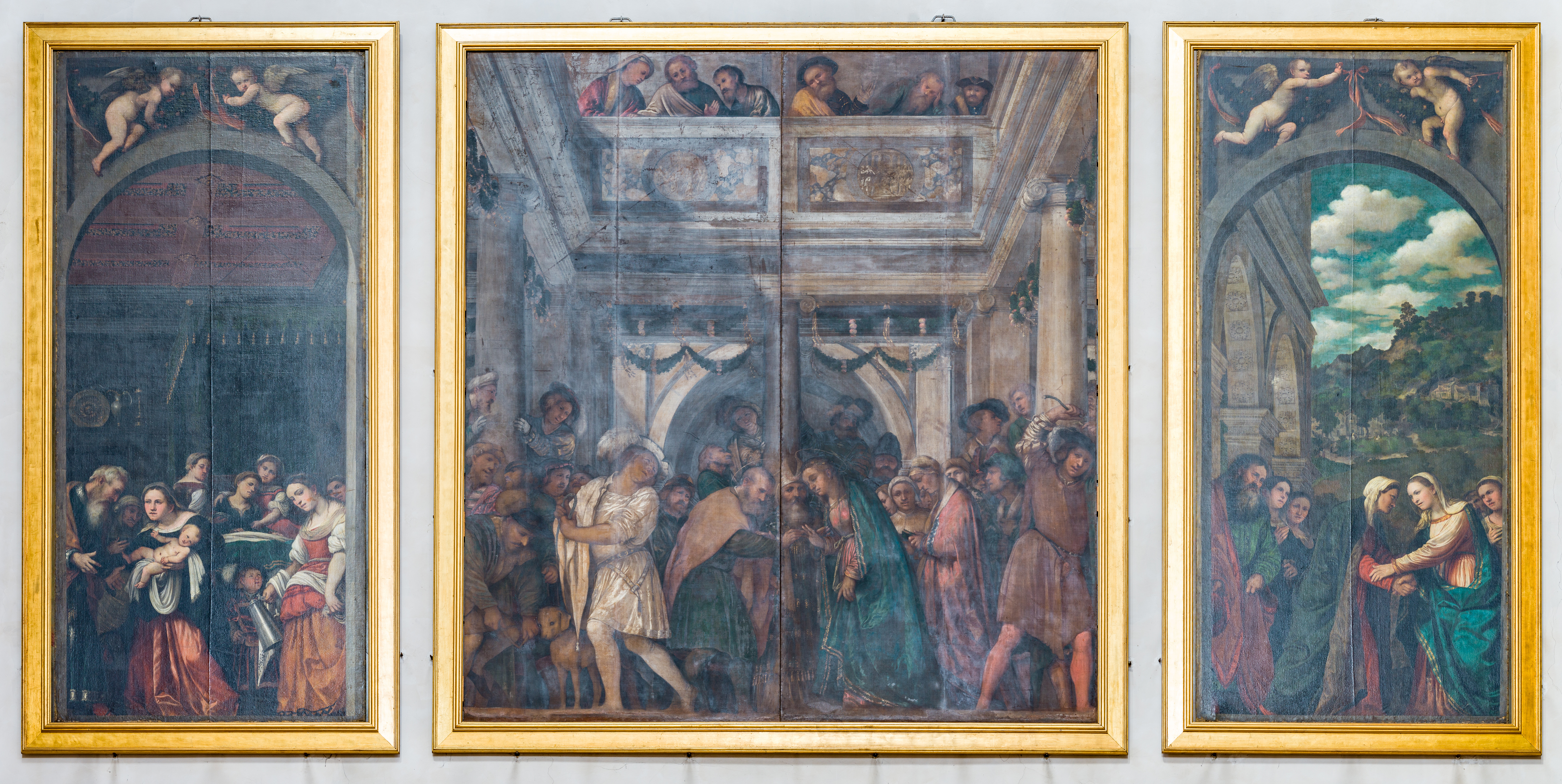
Painting by Romanino in the Duomo nuovo.

The Duomo Nuovo or New Cathedral is the largest Catholic church in Brescia, Italy.

== History ==
Construction was begun in 1604 at the site where the paleo-Christian 5th-6th century basilica of San Pietro de Dom was located. The original commission was given to Andrea Palladio, but it was subsequently granted to the architect Giovanni Battista Lantana. He was aided by Pietro Maria Bagnadore. Work was interrupted during a season of plague around 1630.

Work slowly but sporadically restarted on the construction, but the final impetus for completion came in the nineteenth century. The facade was designed by Giovanni Battista and Antonio Marchetti, while the dome, completed only in 1825, was designed by Luigi Cagnola and with its 80 meters is one of the highest in Italy.

The present dome was rebuilt after destruction during the Second World War. The facade contains statues of the Virgin of the Assumption and Saints Peter, Paul, James, and John.

Among the interior works of art are a scenes from the life of the Virgin by Girolamo Romanino (Marriage, Visitation, and Birth) and a Sacrifice of Isaac by Moretto da Brescia. The main altarpiece is The Assumption of the Virgin with the Apostles (1733-35) by Jacopo Zoboli.

The interior contains a monument to the Brescian Pope Paul VI, found on the left transept. The statue (1975) is a work by Raffaele Scorzelli. The Baroque church towers over the small round and rustic Romanesque church of the Old Cathedral of Brescia (Duomo Vecchio).
