= Giacomo Barucco =

Italian painter

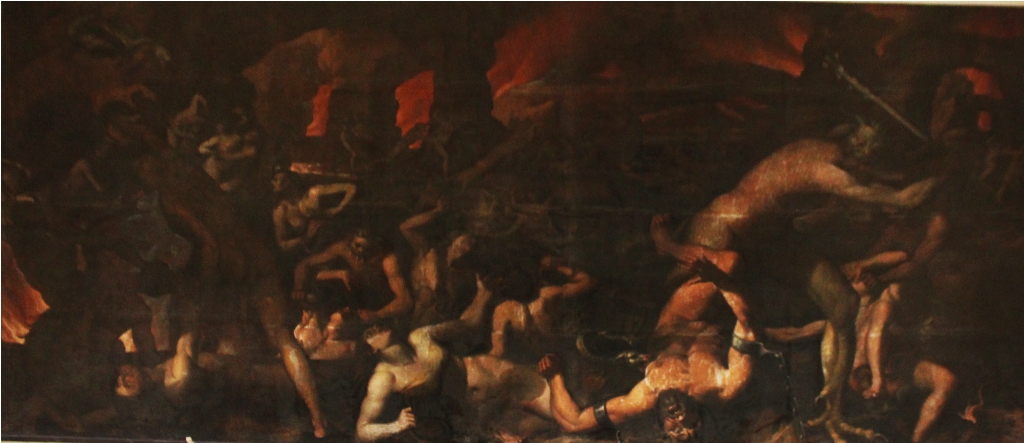
Scena Infernale by Giacomo Barucco, Sant'Angela Merici, Brescia

Giacomo Barucco (Rovato, 1582 - circa 1630) was an Italian painter, active in a Mannerist style.

== Biography ==
He was born in Rovato (Brescia) in 1582. He was active as a painter in Brescia. He acted in the environment of the late Brescian mannerism, together with Antonio Gandino and Camillo Rama, with whom he was sometimes confused.

The only certain work that has remained of him is the Hell in Sant'Afra, a farraginous and confused picture, of vague tintorettesco flavor (Morassi), with Maccarinelli's naive sensibility could have a terrible effect, but fully justifies the overall judgment given by Lanzi: "beyond the common use".

His style was influenced or a pupil of Pietro Marone and Palma il Giovane.

Among his works are a Deposed Christ with two angels and Saints Angelo Carmelitano and Carlo Borromeo for the church of Santa Maria del Carmine in Brescia, assigned to him by Faino, Paglia and others, but by Maccarinelli attributed it to Antonio Gandino; the attribution to Barucco seems more reliable, since in Gandino one usually recognizes a more polished and hard sign, while the work in question is carried out with a fluid and rather pasty hand; it mixes evocative memories of Moretto with a palm-branded venetism, adhering to a typically Mannerist structure. He also painted the Sybils and other frescoes in the church. He also painted a Madonna and child with Saints Lucy, Catherine, and Apollonio for the parish church of Marcheno; and an Annunciation (1609) for the Pieve of Quinzano d’Oglio. He also is attributed a canvas of Christ on the Road to Calvary once found in the Church of the Poveri, also called della Misericordia. The frescoes with the Joyous Mysteries in St. Domenico have been destroyed, and the canvas with Jesus at Calvary of the Church of Mercy has been dispersed (praised especially by Fenaroli).
