= Barucco =

Barucco is a surname. Notable people with the surname include:

- Alberto Barucco (1906–?), Argentine sprinter
- Giacomo Barucco (1582–c. 1630), Italian painter

== See also ==
- Barocco
- Barrueco
