= Sant'Eufemia Altarpiece =

c. 1530 painting by Moretto da Brescia

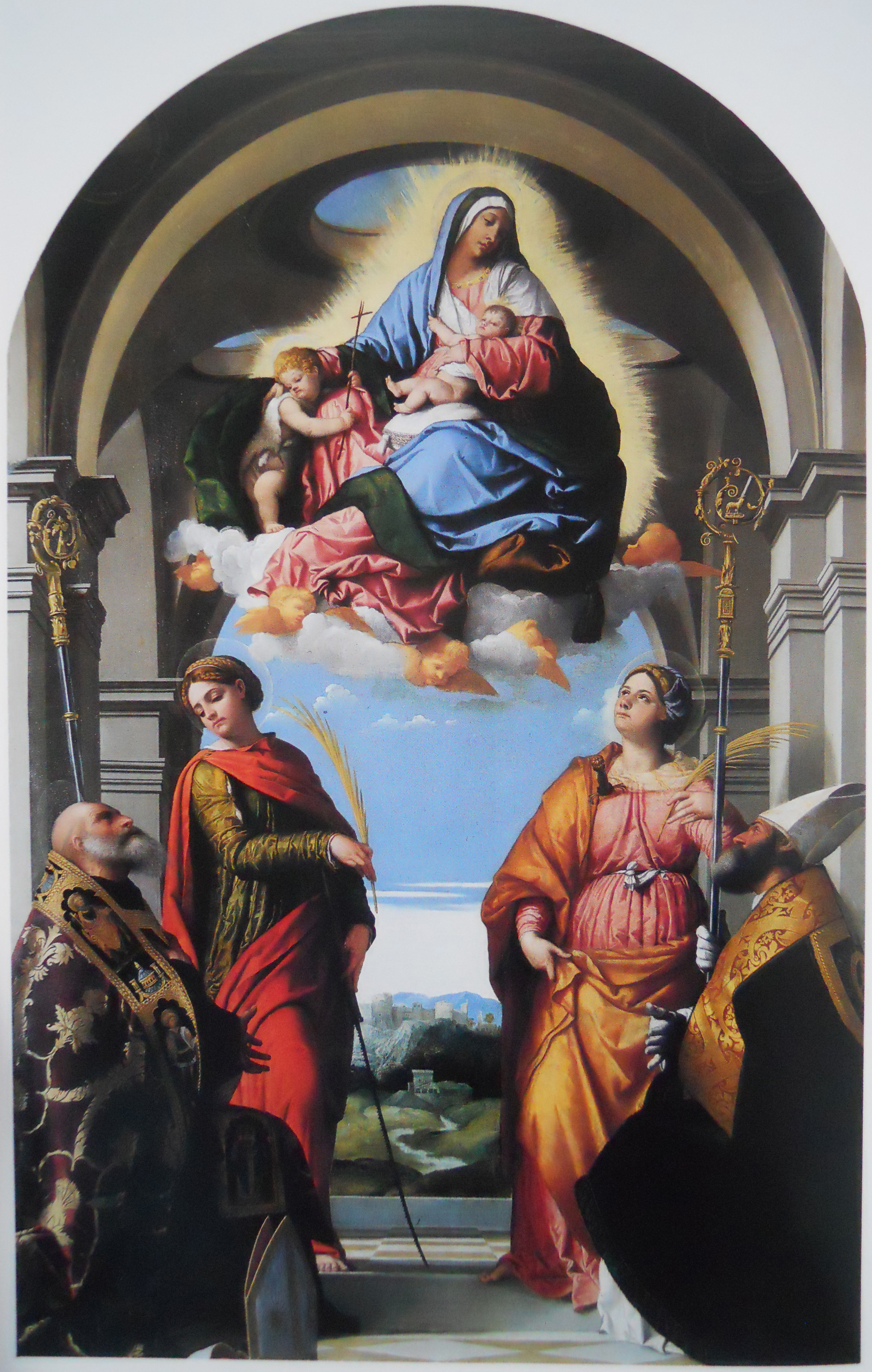
Sant'Eufemia Altarpiece (1526-1530) by Moretto da Brescia

The Sant'Eufemia Altarpiece is a 1526-1530 oil on panel painting by Moretto da Brescia, originally on the high altar of Sant'Afra in Brescia and now in the Pinacoteca Tosio Martinengo in the town. The Sant'Afra Reliquary was also based on the painting. The painting's lower register shows saints Benedict of Nursia, Euphemia, Justina and Paterius.

In 1805 the monastery attached to Sant'Afra was suppressed and converted into a barracks and the church was made subsidiary to Sant'Afra on via Francesco Crispi (now Sant'Angela Merici), whose Fabbriceria decided to donate the painting to the Pinacoteca Tosio Martinengo in 1867 in exchange for a painting by Enea Salmeggia from the same Tosio collection.

== Bibliography (in Italian) ==
- Giulio Antonio Averoldi, Le scelte pitture di Brescia additate al forestiere, Brescia 1700
- Paolo Brognoli, Nuova Guida di Brescia, Brescia 1826
- Camillo Boselli, Il Moretto, 1498-1554, in "Commentari dell'Ateneo di Brescia per l'anno 1954 - Supplemento", Brescia 1954
- Marina Braga, Roberta Simonetto (editors), Le quadre di Sant'Alessandro in Brescia Città Museo, Sant'Eustacchio, Brescia 2004
- Joseph Archer Crowe, Giovanni Battista Cavalcaselle, A history of painting in North Italy, Londra 1871
- Bernardino Faino, Catalogo Delle Chiese riuerite in Brescia, et delle Pitture et Scolture memorabili, che si uedono in esse in questi tempi, Brescia 1630
- György Gombosi, Moretto da Brescia, Basel 1943
- Federico Odorici, Storie Bresciane dai primi tempi sino all'età nostra, Brescia 1853
- Francesco Paglia, Il Giardino della Pittura, Brescia 1660
- Ivo Panteghini, Reliquiario a busto detto di S. Afra in AA.VV., Nel lume del Rinascimento, catalogo della mostra, Edizioni Museo diocesano di Brescia, Brescia 1997
- Pier Virgilio Begni Redona, Alessandro Bonvicino - Il Moretto da Brescia, Editrice La Scuola, Brescia 1988
- Adolfo Venturi, Storia dell'arte italiana, volume IX, La pittura del Cinquecento, Milano 1929
