= Sant'Afra, Brescia =

Church in Lombardy, Italy

Coordinates: 45.535855°N 10.229441°E

Church of Sant'Afra
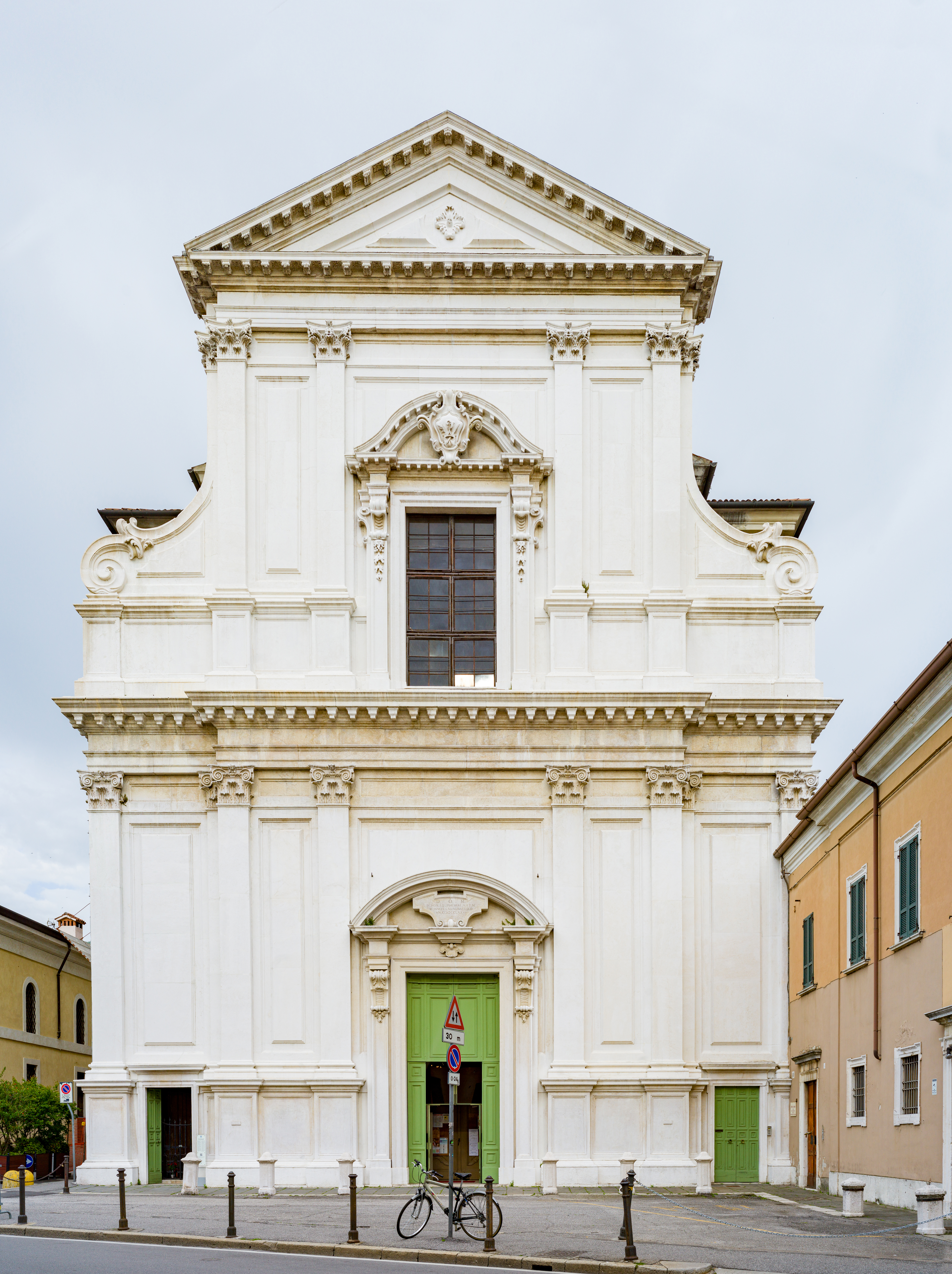

Religion
- Affiliation: Roman Catholic

Location
- Location: Brescia, Italy
- Interactive map of Church of Sant'Afra

Architecture
- Type: Church
- Style: Baroque
- Groundbreaking: 1462
- Completed: 1700s

The church of Sant'Afra in Brescia, also known as the church of Sant'Afra in Sant'Eufemia, is located on Corso Magenta, near Piazzale Arnaldo.

== History ==
Built initially in the 1450s, it underwent major reconstructions starting in the 1600s. It contains a number of prominent artworks, including paintings by Sante Cattaneo, Paolo Veronese, and Enea Salmeggia. The latter painting replaced in 1867 the ‘’Altarpiece of Sant'Eufemia’’ (1526-1530), painted by Alessandro Bonvicino, known as il Moretto, and which was moved to the Pinacoteca Tosio Martinengo.

The term "Sant'Eufemia" derives from the fact, that the church was initially annexed to a monastery associated with the church of Sant'Eufemia della Fonte, just outside the medieval walls of the city. The suffix also distinguished this church of Sant'Afra with another found on via Francesco Crispi. The latter was destroyed during the bombardment of World War II, and has only been rebuilt now as the church of Sant'Angela Merici.

Since it stood outside the city walls, the initial Benedictine monastery near the church, founded about 1022, was prone to looting, and stood mainly abandoned from 1300 to 1450s. In 1462, work begun on a new convent and church. In 1479, the church was finished and the relics of the ancient bishop of Brescia, San Paterio were interred in the crypt under the presbytery. The marble façade was added in the 1700s.

After suppression of the monastery in 1797, the monastery and church became an army barracks in 1859. This led to the loss of the frescoes of ‘’Stories of the old and new testament’’ by Lattanzio Gambara that were in the cloister.

The interior now contains a collection of original and transferred works. The baptismal font here came from the church of Sant'Angela Merici . The first chapel on the right has a Consecration of St Paterio by Camillo Rama; the next chapel has an Adoration by the Magi (1790) by Pietro Moro. The last chapel on the right has a canvas of St Mauro healing the sick by Pompeo Ghitti. By the main altar, on the walls at the end of the choir are the large altarpieces of Saints Catherine, Barbara, Agnese, Lucia, Cecilia, and Euphemia by Enea Salmeggia that replaced the Moretto altarpiece. The main altar holds the relics of St Paterio in an urn, and was sculpted by Antonio Calegari.

The first chapel on the left, holds an altarpiece of the Martyrdom of Sant'Afra by Veronese, which had been in the church of sant'Angela. The second and third chapels have altarpieces by Sante Cattaneo depicting respectively Jesus distributes Eucharist and Saints Benedict of Nursia and Scholastica.

The ceiling decoration dates to 1776, by Pietro Melchiorre Ferrari and Antonio Grassi, and encircles three large ovals by Cattaneo depicting San Paterio offers his writings to St John Baptist, Coronation of the Virgin and the Saints Benedict of Nursia and Scholastica. Cattaneo also painted the four monochrome prophets in the presbytery walls. The dome was decorated (now damaged) by Antonio Mazza (quadratura) and Carlo Innocenzo Carloni (figures) with the Descent of Holy Spirit to Mary and Apostles, and the Four Evangelists. These two artists also decorated the choir ceiling with the Glory (Exaltation) of St Euphemia and figures of faith and charity. The walls beside the altar have four episodes of the Martyrdom of St. Euphemia painted by Camillo Rama. The organ cover has a work by Jacopo Palma the younger, depicting the Saints Faustinus and Jovita.

The crypt apparently was attached to the primitive church. It contains a Madonna by Vincenzo Civerchio and some paintings originating from the church of sant'Angela Merici by Francesco Giugno, depicting Saints Faustino and Jovita, Martyrdom of the Saints Faustino and Jovita, and Sant'Afra. There are some fragments of 15th-century frescoes. The casket of St Paterio, once here, is now in the Museo di Santa Giulia.

== Bibliography ==
- Marina Braga, Roberta Simonetto (a cura di), Le quadre di Sant'Alessandro in Brescia Città Museo, Sant'Eustacchio, Brescia 2004
- Ivo Panteghini, Reliquiario a busto detto di S. Afra in AA.VV., Nel lume del Rinascimento, catalogo della mostra, Edizioni Museo diocesano di Brescia, Brescia 1997
