= Santa Maria delle Grazie, Brescia =

Church building in Brescia, Italy

Coordinates: 45.5426°N 10.213179°E

Church of Santa Maria delle Grazie
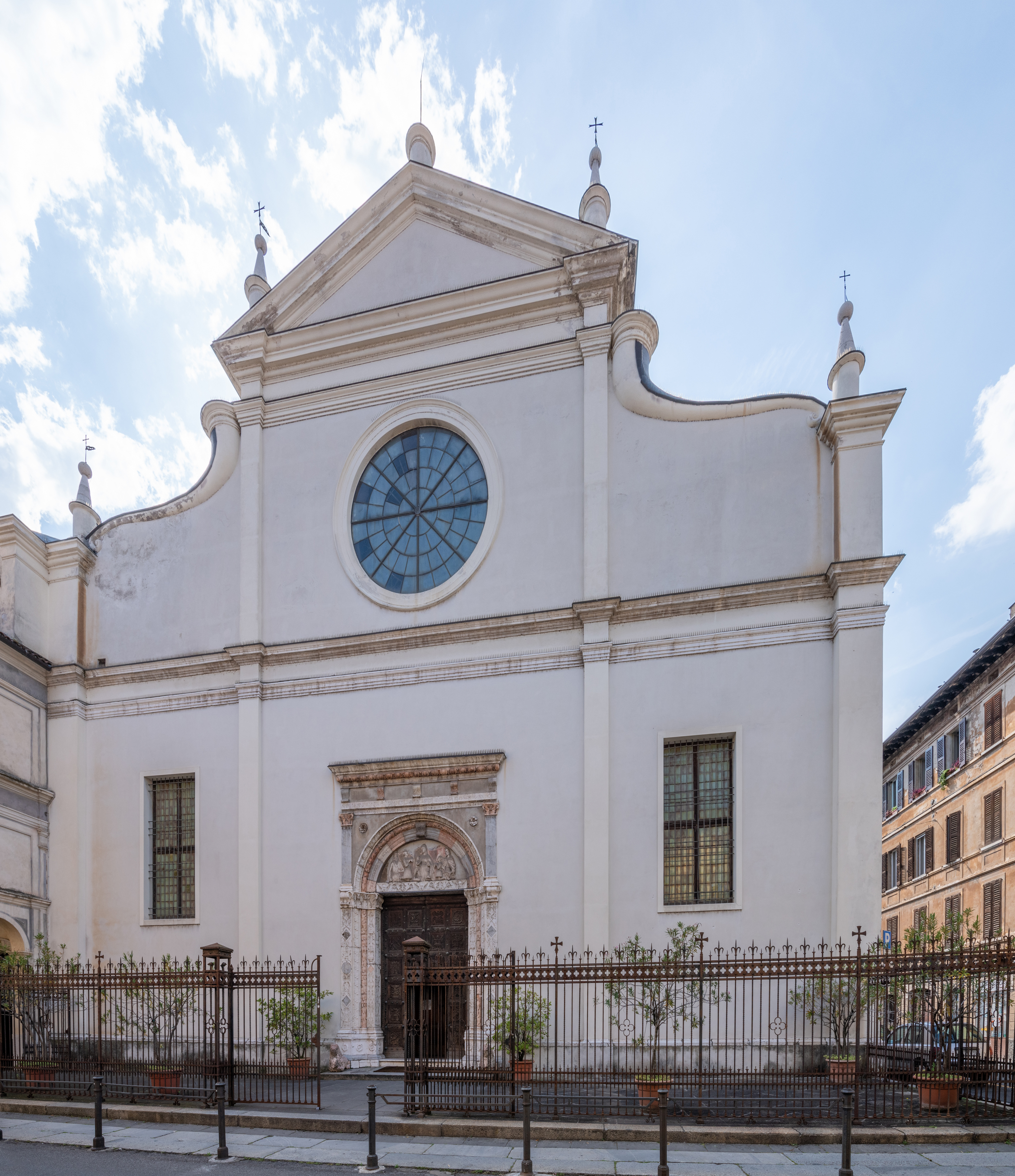
- The main façade of the basilica

Religion
- Affiliation: Roman Catholic
- Year consecrated: 1539

Location
- Location: Brescia, Italy
- Interactive map of Church of Santa Maria delle Grazie

Architecture
- Architect: Ludovico Barcella
- Type: Church
- Style: Baroque
- Groundbreaking: 1522
- Completed: 17th century

The church of Santa Maria delle Grazie in Brescia is located at the western end of Via Elia Capriolo, at its intersection with Via delle Grazie. Built in the 16th century and remodeled in the 17th century, it retains artworks by major regional artists, including one of three canvases by Moretto. The other two are now held at the Pinacoteca Tosio Martinengo. The interior is richly decorated in the Baroque style. Adjacent to the church is the Sanctuary of Santa Maria delle Grazie, a Neo-Gothic work.

== History ==
A church at this site, which lay outside the then city walls, was founded in the early 16th century by Hieronymite monks. Almost abandoned after the devastating siege of the city in 1512, the Hieronymites began constructing a new church in 1522. When the Hieronymites were suppressed in 1668, the Pope Clement IX, transferred the monastery to the Jesuits, who established a school. In 1797, the monastery was closed, but the church remained open.

The façade has a bronze statue of the Madonna della Pace, by Emilio Magoni. The front rose window depicts a nativity. In the center of the façade, a sculpted marble portal derives from another church, which had stood outside the city walls, but which was demolished in 1517 by the Venetian authorities. The inscription reads:

MATTHEUS LEONEUS HANC PORTAM PROPRIIS FABREFACTAM SUMPTIBUS BEATAE DEI GENITRICI GRATIARUM MARIAE DEVOTE DEDICAVIT", recalling the patronage of the condettiore Matteo Leoni. Another inscription quotes Bernard of Siena: "SINE GRATIA DEI ET MARIE NULLUM / PRORSUS SIVE VOLENDO SIVE AGENDO / FACIUNT HOMINES BONUM E SIMILITER EXCELSA VIRGINI DISPENSO DISPENSATORI".

The carved portals are attributed to Filippo Morari da Soresina.

== Interior ==
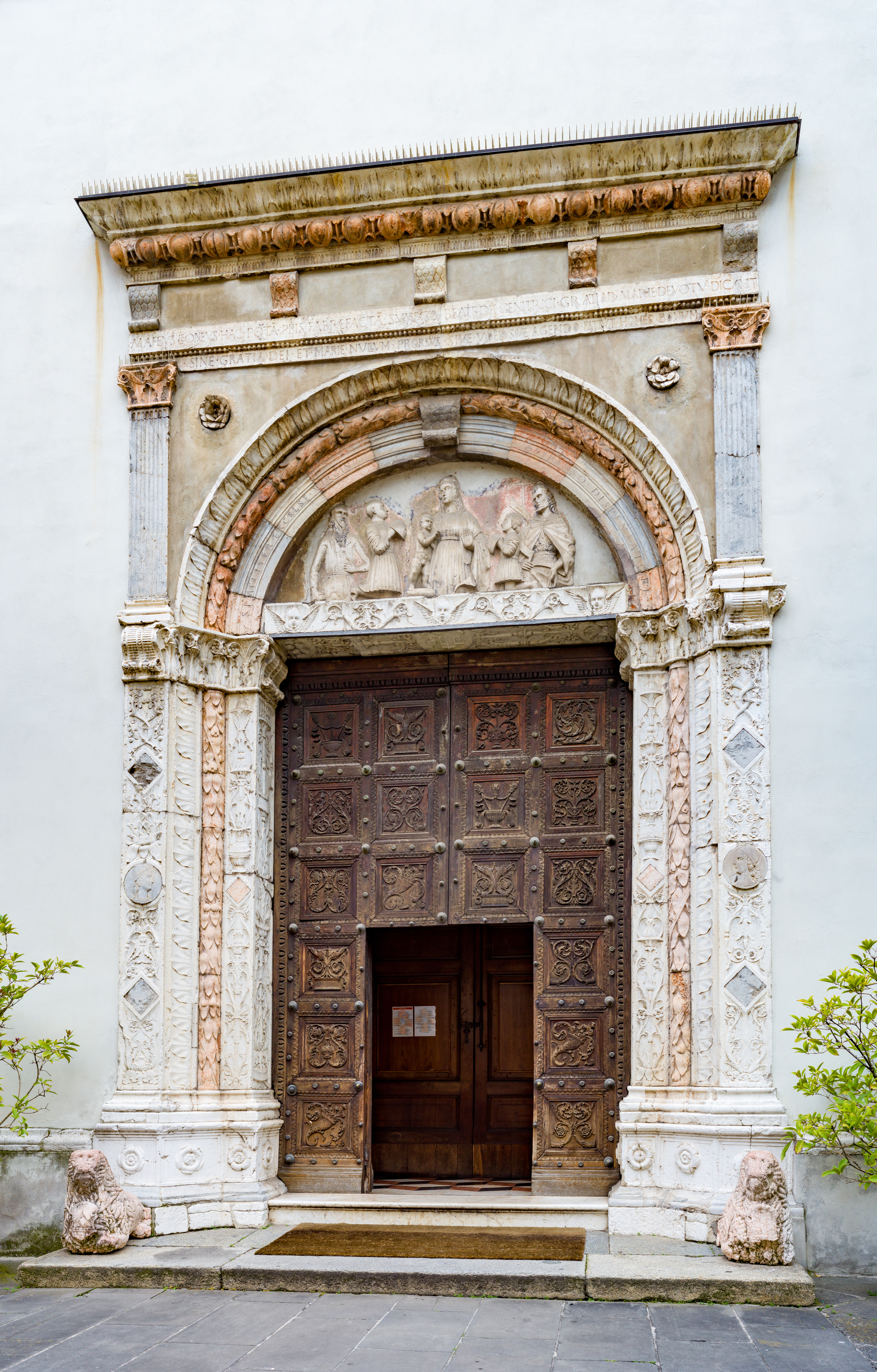
The renaissance portal to the basilica

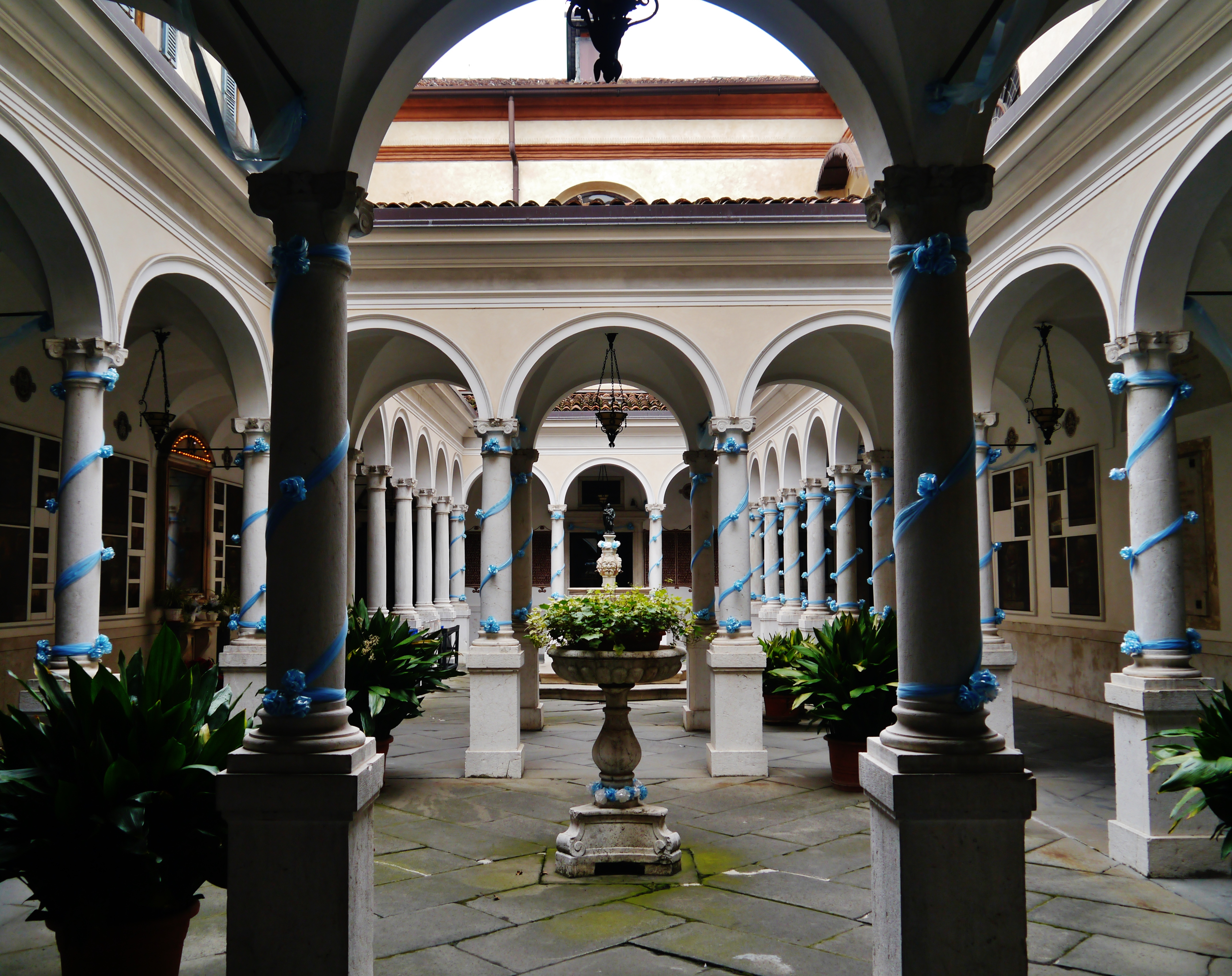
Cloister of the Basilica

The interior is decorated by numerous artists including, Francesco Giugno, author of five medallion canvases in the central ceiling depicting the Apparition of Christ to his Mother, Pentecost, as well as Assumption, Coronation, and Death of the Virgin. Giovanni Mauro della Rovere painted in the presbytery, while Girolamo Muziano painted Episodes in the life of San Gerolamo in the small dome near the altar of the patron saint.

=== Right nave ===
The first altar to the right has a canvas depicting a Martyrdom of St Barbara by Pietro Rosa, pupil of Titian. This altar was patronized by the association (scuola) of artillerymen of the Venetian Republic. The next altar originally had a Redeemer with Saints Rocco, Vittoria, and Corona by Palma the Younger, but the Gesuiti changed the altar to venerate Saint Francis Xavier and replaced the altarpiece with a St Francis Xavier with the Japanese (1745) by Pietro Antonio Rotari. The next altar of Saints Lucia and Apollonia, has a canvas depicting ‘’Saints before Madonna, child, St. Joseph, and angel’’ by Alessandro Maganza. The next altar originally had a painting of ‘’Saints Anthony of Padua with St Anthony Abbot and Nicola of Tolentino’’ by Moretto, but now it has a copy by Bortolo Schermini. Over the lateral door is a painting of the Nativity by Callisto Piazza. The next altar has a canvas depicting ‘’St Francis Regis’’ by Simone Brentana. The chapel at the head of the nave has a Madonna and child in Glory with Saints Rocco, Martin, and Sebastian by Moretto. On the left wall is a painting of San Martin resuscitates the child of a widow by Francesco Maffei.

=== Presbytery ===
To the sides of the holy ark are conserved relics of St. Jerome. The main altar has a modern copy of the Nativity by Moretto (original in Pinacoteca Tosinengo). In the choir walls are canvases of the Marriage of Mary (1609) and Visitation by Mary and Elizabeth by the monk Tiburzio Baldini, the Circumcision of Jesus by Francesco Giugno, Adoration of the Magi’‘ (1610) by Grazio Cossali, and a Purification of the Virgin’‘ (1660) by Antonio Gandino.

The organ (1844) by Serassi replaces the earlier organ that had been constructed by Giangiacomo Antegnati, and which had been decorated by Pietro Rosa with The Emperor Augustus hears the Cumaen Sybil foretell the coming Christ. At the sides of the organ is an Annunciation and Presentation of Jesus at the Temple by Gandino, a Massacre of the Innocents by Baldini, and a Birth of the Virgin by Camillo Procaccini.

=== Left nave ===
The chapel in the left of the apse, contains a Deposition and Crucifixion by brother Baldini, and conserves a 16th-century painted wooded Crucifix. The chapel has the marble mausoleum of Tommaso Caprioli (1620), a condottiero for the Republic. Over the entrance to the cloister is an Adoration by the Shepherds with Jesuits by a follower of Pietro Maria Bagnadore. The next altar is dedicated to the Immaculate Conception, and has a stucco decoration from the late 16th century, and a canvas depicting St Anne and young John by Bagnadore, next to which is a depiction of the Immaculate Conception surrounded by angels by Giuseppe Tortelli. Next, the altar of St Aloysius Gonzaga, has a Virgin with St Aloysius Gonzaga and Stanislaus Kostka, protector of the order, painted by Antonio Paglia. The next altar has a painting of the Madonna della Misericordia with Saints Michael, John the Baptist, Bernard, and the Magdalen. by a follower of Moretto. At the altar of St. Jerome, has a painting of Madonna delle Grazie with Saints Jerome, Eusebius, Eustochia and Paola painted by Paolo Caylina il Giovane. The altar has the putative heelbone of St Jerome as a relic. The counterfacade of the church has a large canvas painted with the Massacre of the Innocents by fra Baldini.

== Sanctuary ==
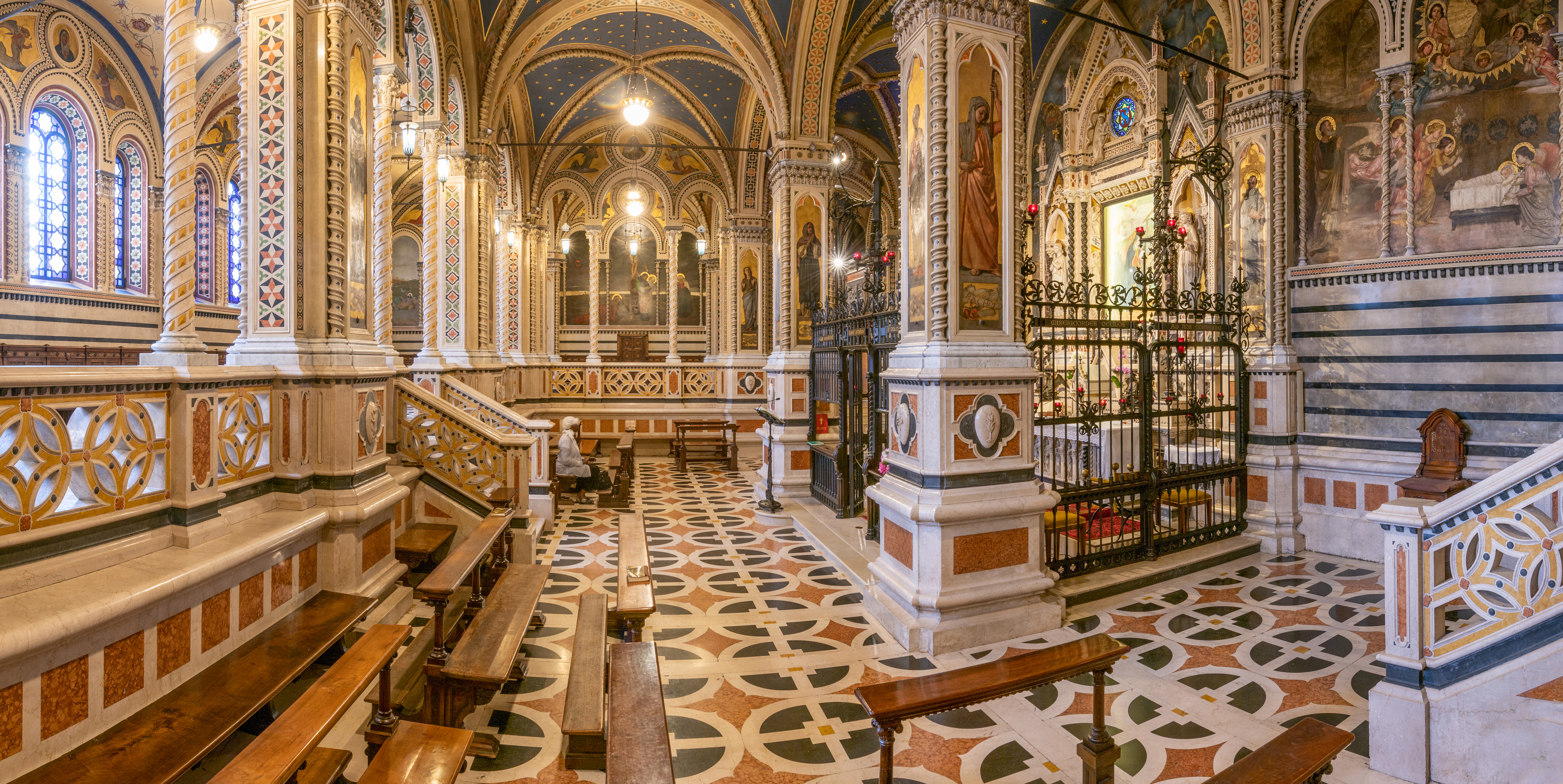
Interior of the sanctuary

The small neogothic sanctuary, is all that remains from the original church of Santa Maria di Palazzolo, built in the 13th century by the Umiliati. The building was last heavily restructured and the interior redecorated in the 19th century. It contains a bronze statue of St Callegari. The refurbishing of this sanctuary was completed in 19th century by Antonio Tagliaferri.

== Sources ==
- Marina Braga, Roberta Simonetto (a cura di), Il quartiere Carmine in Brescia Città Museo, Sant'Eustacchio, Brescia 2004
- Vito Zani, Maestri e cantieri nel Quattrocento e nella prima metà del Cinquecento in Valerio Terraroli (a cura di), "Scultura in Lombardia. Arti plastiche a Brescia e nel Bresciano dal XV al XX secolo", Skira, Milano 2011
