= San Marco Evangelista, Brescia =

Church in Brescia, Italy

Coordinates: 45.5383°N 10.2249°E

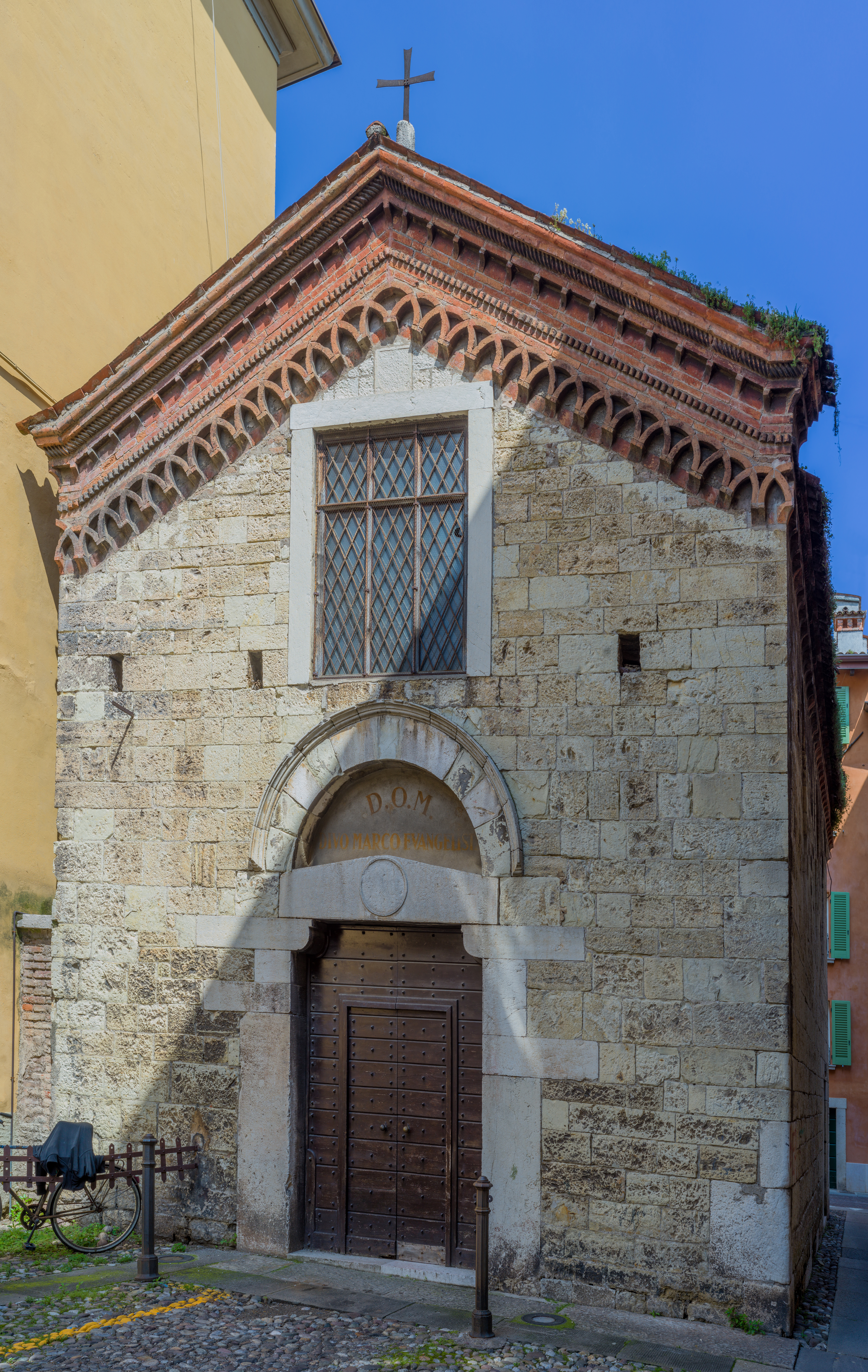
Facade of the church

San Marco Evangelista is a Romanesque-style, Roman Catholic church located at the end of via Laura Cereto in central Brescia, region of Lombardy, Italy.

== History ==
This small church was erected at the end of the 13th century as a family chapel for the Avogadro family, who owned the nearby Palazzo Avogadro. The church was damaged by a bombing raid during World War II. A frieze of earthenware arches intertwining under the cornice that goes all round the building. On the façade is a stone portal surmounted by a rounded arch; above a modern rectangular window was inserted to replace a round medieval rosette. On the right hand side of the building there is a door with a cross in high relief. The interior contains traces of frescoes and a canvas by Pietro Marone.
