= Ottavio Amigoni =

Italian 17th century painter

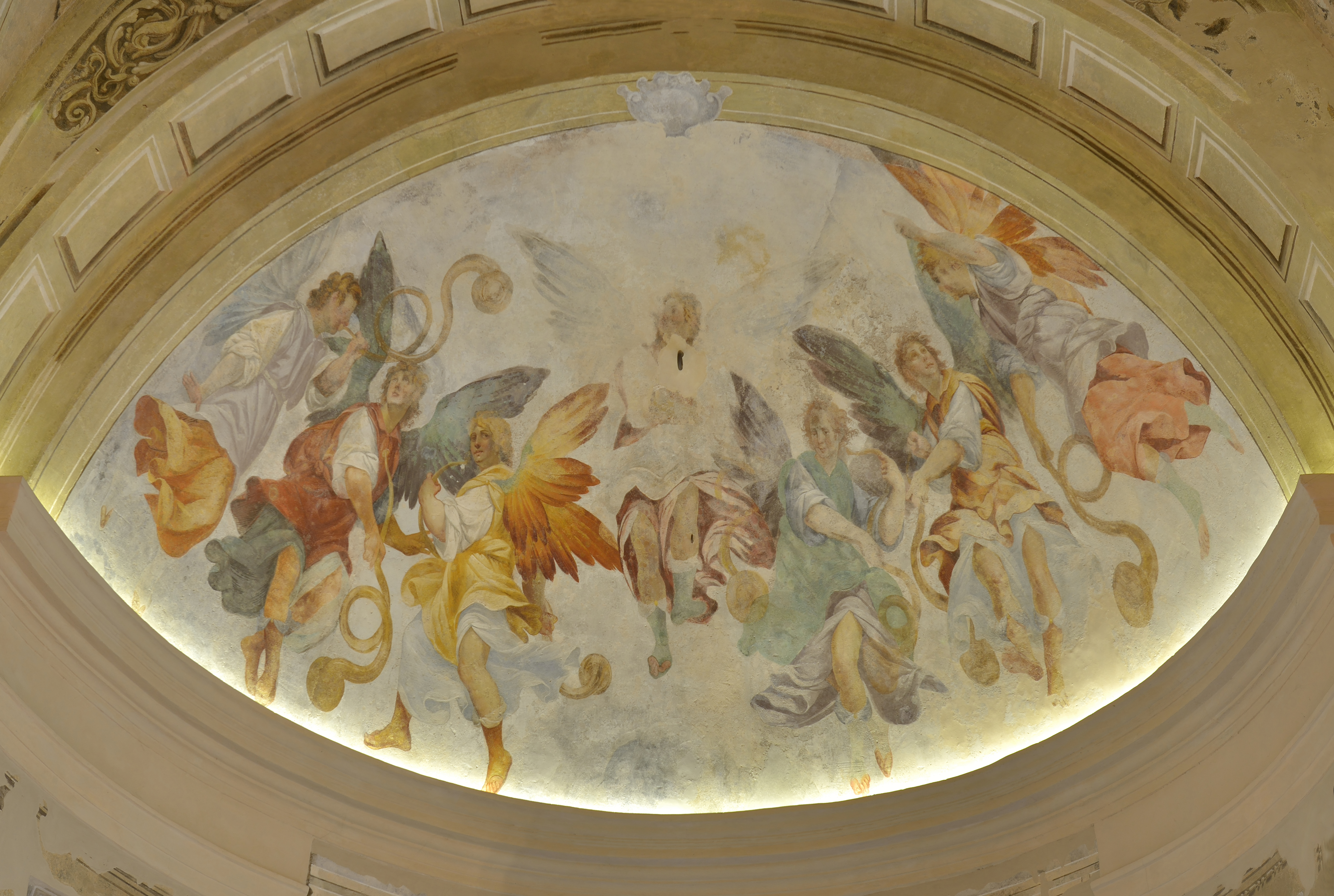
Fresco of the Seven Angels of the Apocalypse in the Chiesa di San Giorgio church by Ottavio Amigoni in Brescia

Ottavio Amigoni (16 October 1606 – 28 October 1661) was an Italian painter of the Baroque period, active in Brescia. He was trained by Antonio Gandini. Among his masterpieces is a large fresco about the life of Sant'Alberto (c. 1640) in the Carmelite church of Brescia, painted with Gandino's son, Bernardino.

== Biography ==
The date of birth of the Amigoni, that had been open to discussion in artistic literature for a long period and fell anywhere between 1605 and 1665, was finally fixed with certainty only in 2006 after careful research in the parish archives of the church di Sant'Agata. It was discovered that he was born on 16 October 1606.

He initially worked as a chemist at his father's workshop but, before 1632, for unknown reasons he had already traveled to Genoa and Bologna, getting from the first city the teaching of Bernardo Strozzi and from the second the method used by Bartolomeo Cesi, these motives were noticeable in his first famous work, San Rocco and Nicola da Tolentino invoke the Virgin to spare Sergnana from the plague in the presence of the saints Bartolomeo, Faustino and Giovita that is preserved in the church of San Rocco in Provezze. The altarpiece is dated 1632 and can be attributed to a first experiment, performed on the basis of the works seen during the two journeys just completed, works belonging to the worlds that were very different from the environment in Brescia.

Closer to the "local" style appears his second known work, Madonna with Child between Saints Charles and Francis for the church of Saint Giorgio in Cellatica, signed and dated 1633. In the painting the influences of Genoa and Bologna were much more attenuated to give way to the lessons of Pietro da Marone, Paolo Veronese and Moretto. The following year, he painted a fresco of the two great monochromes of Saint Gregorio Magno and Saint'Onorio on the counter-façade of the church of Saints Faustino and Giovita in Brescia, where the shift towards more characteristic features of the Brescia area can be found.

The activity of Amigoni in the second half of the 1630s, which would thus attest the evolution of his reunion with local art, remains obscure today due to the loss of some works that were fundamental in this sense.

In the early 1640s, still for unknown reasons, he traveled to Switzerland and left the altarpiece of the Perdon d'Assisi in the church of San Francesco in Ruis, in the Surselva District, signed and dated 1642. It is therefore his first work, which has reached a certain attribution after the two frescoes of 1633. This work was also the beginning of the most prolific period of the painter, which lasted twenty years until his death. During this period he already matured in a personal style oriented more towards baroque features than mannerism of the Gandino.

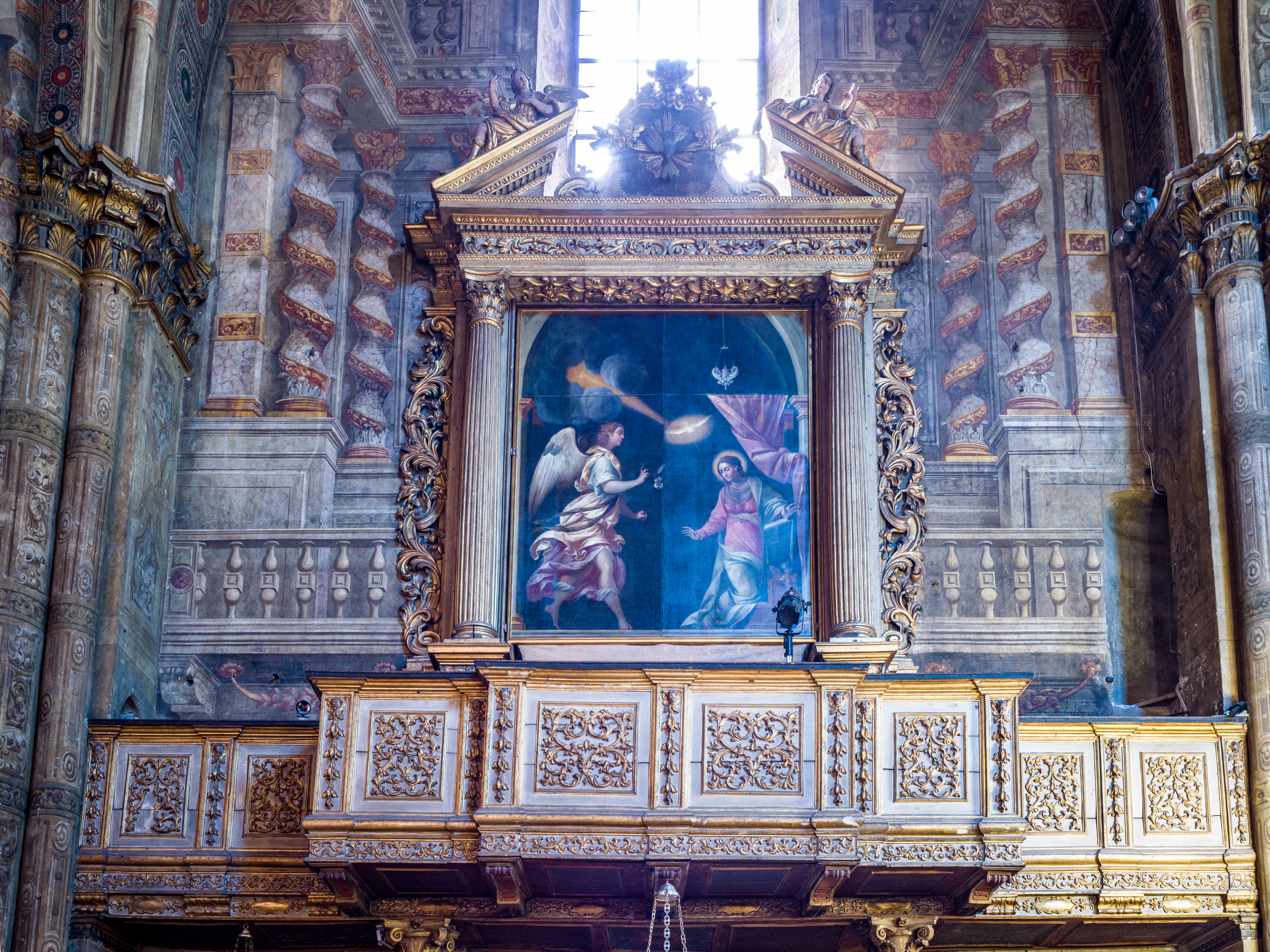
Annunciation by Ottavio Amigoni in the Sant'Agata church in Brescia.

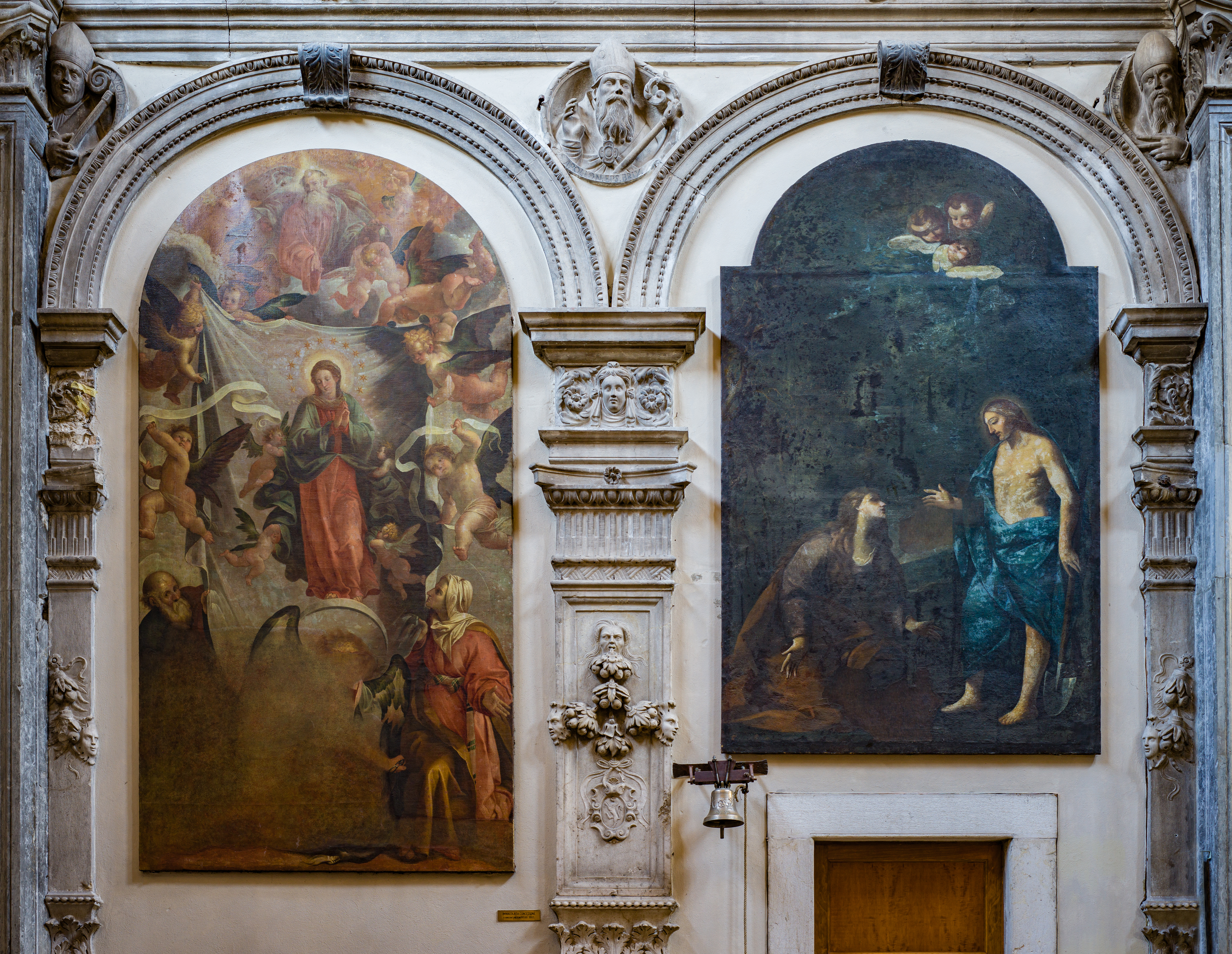
The Immaculate by Ottavio Amigoni and Noli me tangere by Giuseppe Fali in the Santa Maria dei Miracoli church in Brescia.

In 1642 he signed the Madonna with Child and the saints Eufemia and Francesco in the parish church of Vello, thus testifying his return to Brescia, and again in the same year he executed the frescoes on the semi-dome of the apse and the central vault of the church of San Giorgio.

The style of Amigoni, now turned to a true experimentation with contemporary baroque lines, does not stop in the second half of the 40s. It was still able to be found in the church of Santa Maria dei Miracoli in Brescia with the paintings of 1648 of the Immaculate Conception and Presentation in the Temple of Mary (the first half-destroyed and the second completely destroyed in 1944 during a bombing), then again in Chiari, Paitone and Zone. Here he performs for the parish church a Madonna with Child, St. George, St. Rocco and a devotee, another masterpiece, where his experiments reached a certain stability, allowing the artist to return to the lessons learned at the beginning of his training and enrich them with the new, well-established baroque style.

In the 1650s he turned to light tones, while the traits are becoming increasingly important: this aspect is clearly visible, for example in San Gregorio Magno in the sanctuary of the Madonna della Misericordia in Bovegno, dated 1650. A masterpiece of early 50s is the Madonna with Child and Saint Bernard Abbot for the church of San Bernardo in Marone, with almost silver tones on twisted figures. For two years (1655-1656) Amigoni returns to painting frescos with the internal frieze of the church of Santa Maria della Carità in Brescia, executed together with Agostino Avanzo and now lost, and with the decoration of the Villa Togni salon in Gussago, created in collaboration with the young Pompeo Ghitti.

After this date, however, the artist's tracks are becoming increasingly rare. In 1660 he reappeared with a shovel in the parish church of Gorzone depicting the Saints Ambrogio and Antonio da Padova.

Ottavio Amigoni died on 28 October 1661 in his hometown and was buried in the church of San Giuseppe.
