= Francesco Caccianiga =

Italian painter and engraver (1700–1781)

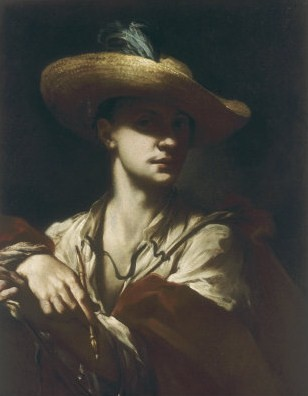
Self-portrait, Vasari Corridor, Uffizi, Florence

Francesco Caccianiga (6 August 1700 – 14 March 1781) was an Italian painter and engraver.

== Biography ==
Francesco Caccianiga was born in Milan on 6 August 1700. He trained in Bologna, where he was a pupil of Marcantonio Franceschini. He afterwards visited Rome, where he established himself under the patronage of Marcantonio Borghese, 5th Prince of Sulmona, for whom he executed some considerable works in the Palazzo and the Villa Borghese. His principal works are at Ancona, where he painted several altar-pieces, among them, Marriage of the Virgin and Last Supper. A few engravings by him are known, one being The Death of Lucretia. He died in Rome on 14 March 1781.
