= Marriage of the Virgin =

Scene in Christian art

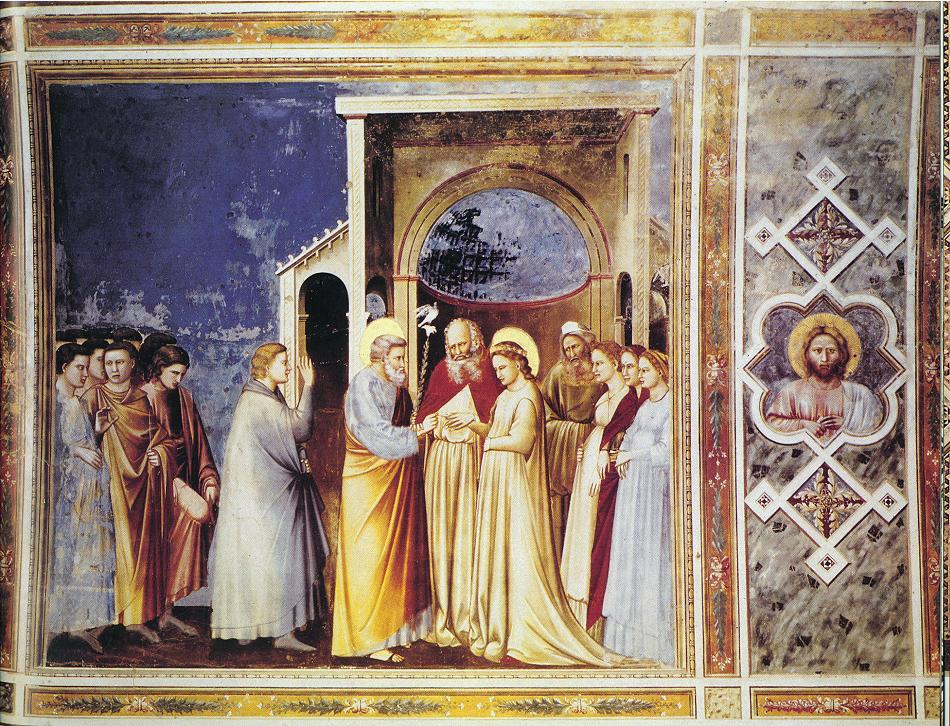
The Marriage of the Virgin (1304–1306) by Giotto (Scrovegni Chapel)

The Marriage of the Virgin is the subject in Christian art depicting the marriage of the Virgin Mary and Saint Joseph. The wedding ceremony is not mentioned in the canonical Gospels but is covered in several apocryphal sources and in later redactions, notably the 14th-century compilation the Golden Legend. Unlike many other scenes in Life of the Virgin cycles (like the Nativity of Mary and Presentation of Mary), it is not a feast in the church calendar, though it sometimes has been in the past.

In the Eastern Orthodox tradition, essentially the same scene, with very similar iconography, is considered to represent the earlier scene of the "Entrusting of Mary to Joseph", with Joseph being made Mary's guardian by the temple authorities.

In art the subject could be covered in several different scenes, and the betrothal of Mary, with Joseph's blossoming rod, was often shown, despite its apocryphal origin. The wedding procession may also be shown, especially in the Early Medieval period. Giotto's famous fresco cycle in the Scrovegni Chapel (1303) covers the story in four scenes. By the later Middle Ages and Renaissance the betrothal and marriage were often shown as a single scene, with the disappointed suitors holding their bare rods, or snapping them.

The lack of scriptural backing for the details, and the fall from fashion of predelle, led to it falling into disfavour in the Counter-Reformation.

The feast for the Espousals of the Blessed Virgin Mary, now only celebrated by some parts of the Catholic Church, is on January 23.

== The betrothal in the Golden Legend ==
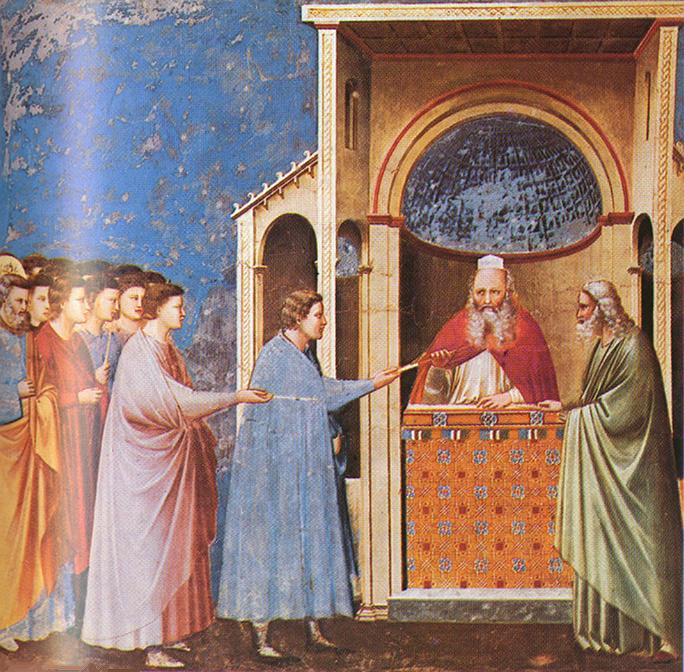
Giotto, Scrovegni Chapel, 1303, The Rods Brought to the Temple

The Golden Legend, which derives its account from the much older Gospel of Pseudo-Matthew, recounts how, when Mary was 14 and living in the Temple, the High Priest gathered all male descendants of David of marriageable age including Saint Joseph. The High Priest ordered them to each bring a rod; he that owned the rod which would bear flowers was divinely ordained to become Mary's husband. After the Holy Spirit descended as a dove and caused Joseph's rod to blossom, he and Mary were wed according to Jewish custom. The account, quoted in its entirety, runs thus:

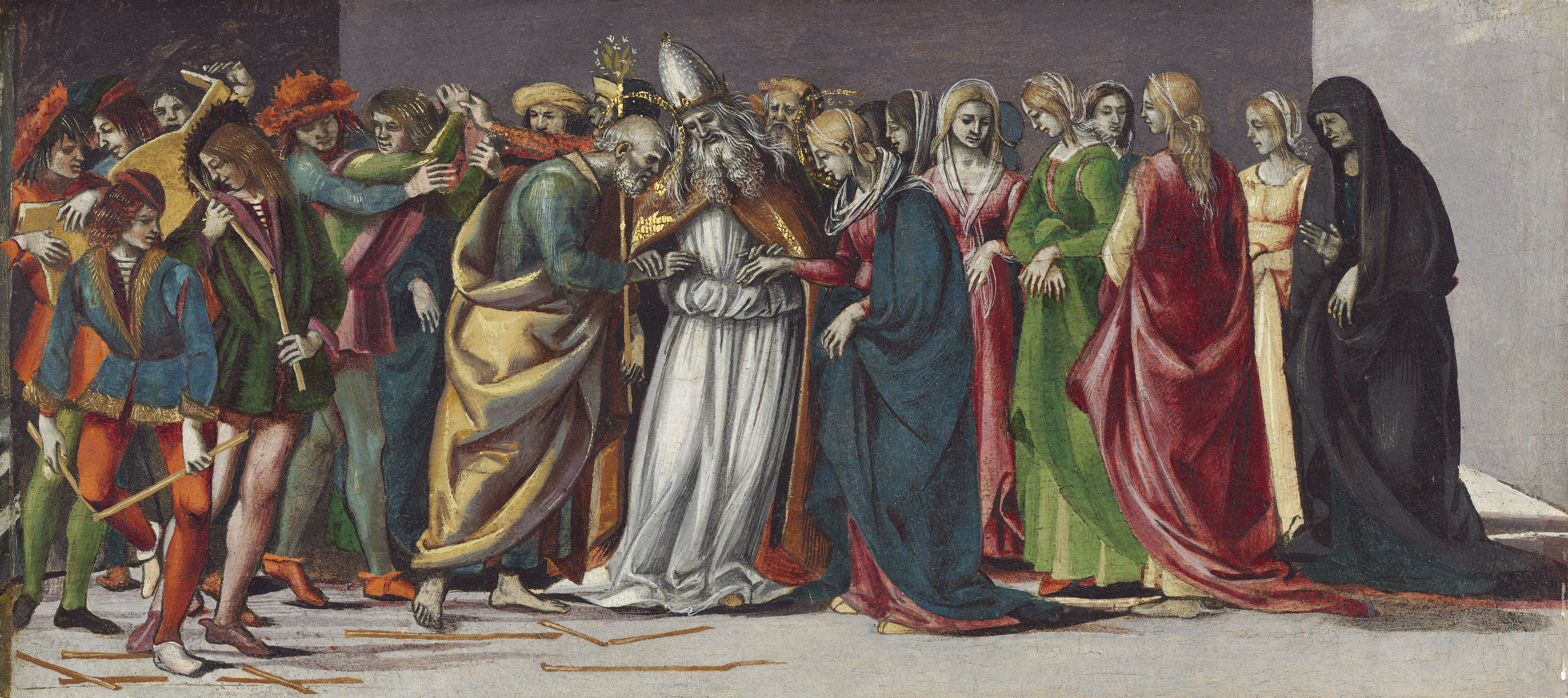
Luca Signorelli, The Marriage of the Virgin, c. 1490–1491, a predella scene for his Adoration of the Magi, with the discarded rods at left.

When [Mary] had come to her fourteenth year, the high priest announced to all that the virgins who were reared in the Temple, and who had reached the age of their womanhood, should return to their own, and be given in lawful marriage. The rest obeyed the command, and Mary alone answered that this she could not do, both because her parents had dedicated her to the service of the Lord, and because she herself had vowed her virginity to God.... When the high priest went in to take counsel with God, a voice came forth from the oratory for all to hear, and it said that of all the marriageable men of the house of David who had not yet taken a wife, each should bring a branch and lay it upon the altar, that one of the branches would burst into flower and upon it the Holy Ghost would come to rest in the form of a dove, according to the prophecy of Isaias, and that he to whom this branch belonged would be the one to whom the virgin should be espoused. Joseph was among the men who came.... [and he] placed a branch upon the altar, and straightaway it burst into bloom, and a dove came from Heaven and perched at its summit; whereby it was manifest to all that the Virgin was to become the spouse of Joseph.

In fact, neither the Golden Legend nor any of the early apocryphal accounts describe the actual ceremony, and they differ as to its timing, other than that it preceded the "Journey to Bethlehem". It is unclear whether this story was set before or after the Annunciation which, in the New Testament account, occurred after their betrothal but before their marriage. In the Gospel of James it comes after the Annunciation, but in the Gospel of Pseudo-Matthew, the primary source in the West, it comes before it.

== Summa Theologiae ==
Saint Thomas Aquinas lists a series of arguments for about the appropriateness of the marriage of Mary and Joseph:

- in respect of Mary's son Jesus: the marriage was celebrated to avoid the legal restrictions to which illegitimate children were subjected; to confirm the direct descent of the Messiah from King David, a fact for which the paternal line of descent was important, regardless of the fact that Mary also belonged to the house of the King of Israel; to conceal the virgin conception and birth from the Devil (as reported by some Fathers of the Church);
- in respect of the Virgin Mary: to protect her from accusations of adultery, which, according to the Mosaic law, was punishable by stoning; to protect her from infamy; to ensure that a father would be able to financially provide to the Son of God;
- in respect of Saint Joseph: Saint Joseph believed the angel who announced to him a miraculous birth; given the importance of fertility and numerous (or royal) offspring in a patriarchy society, the fact that the offspring were a sign of God's blessing, once married Mary could never have invented and lied about a virgin birth and divine conception.

Other arguments are: As Mary, from being a virgin and spouse, became the mother of Jesus Christ, so the Church, which is the virgin spouse of Christ, becomes the mother of numerous brothers of the Lord, brothers who are united to the church through Baptism.

In the person of the Virgin Mary, the Lord intended to 'honour in her both virginity and marriage', typical vocations of Christian life.

== Artists ==
The scene, or scenes, was a common component in larger cycles of the Life of the Virgin and thus very frequently found, especially in the Middle Ages; it is not found in the typical cycle in a Book of hours however. It was often a predella scene underneath the main scene in an altarpiece centred on Mary,

The marriage scene has been painted by, among others, Giotto, Perugino, Raphael, Ventura Salimbeni (1613, his last painting), Domenico Ghirlandaio (1485-1490, at the Tornabuoni Chapel), Bernardo Daddi (now in the Royal Collection), Pieter van Lint (1640, Antwerp Cathedral), Tiburzio Baldini, Alfonso Rivarola, Francesco Caccianiga, Niccolò Berrettoni, Giovanni Jacopo Caraglio, Filippo Bellini, Veronese (in San Polo church, Venice), Giulio Cesare Milani, Franciabigio (in the Santissima Annunziata, Florence), and Giacomo di Castro.

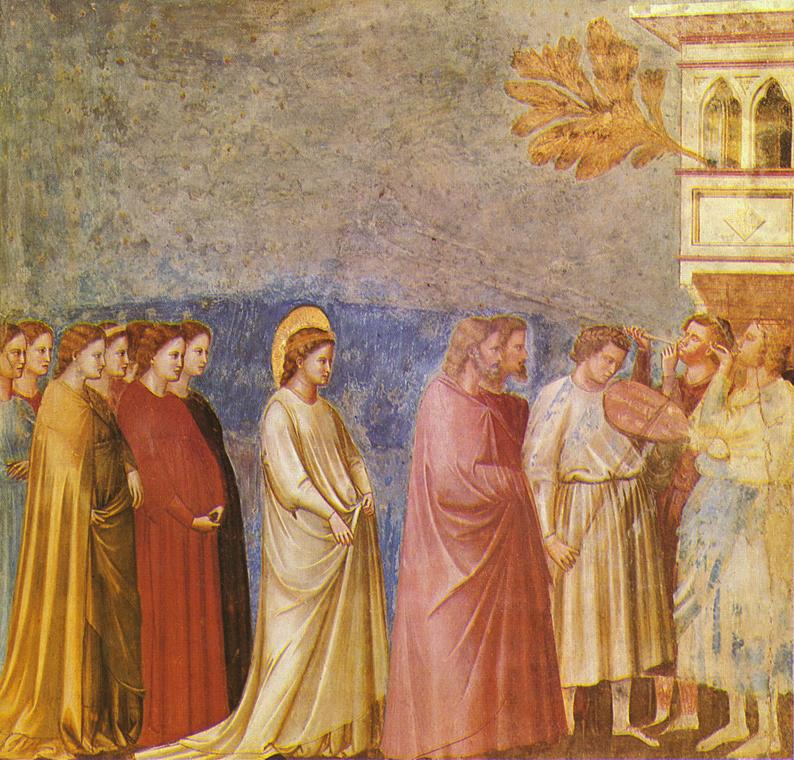
Wedding Procession of Mary by Giotto, 1303

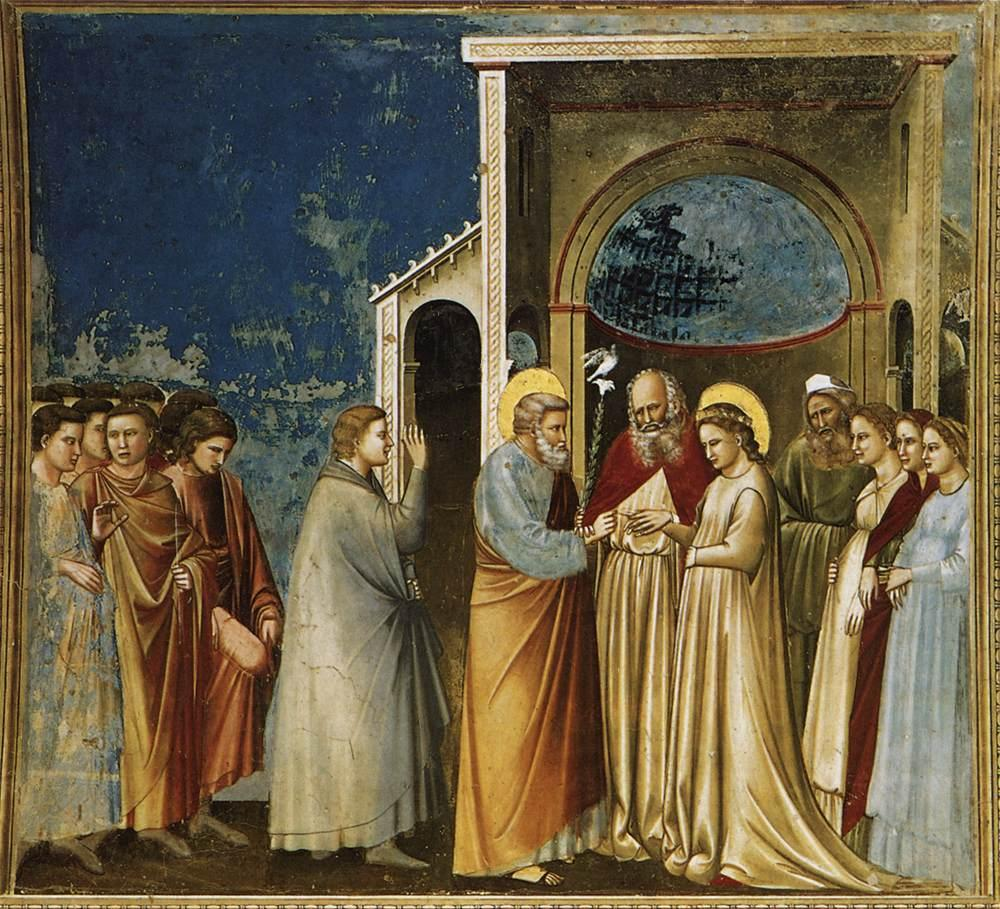
Marriage of the Virgin by Giotto, c. 1305

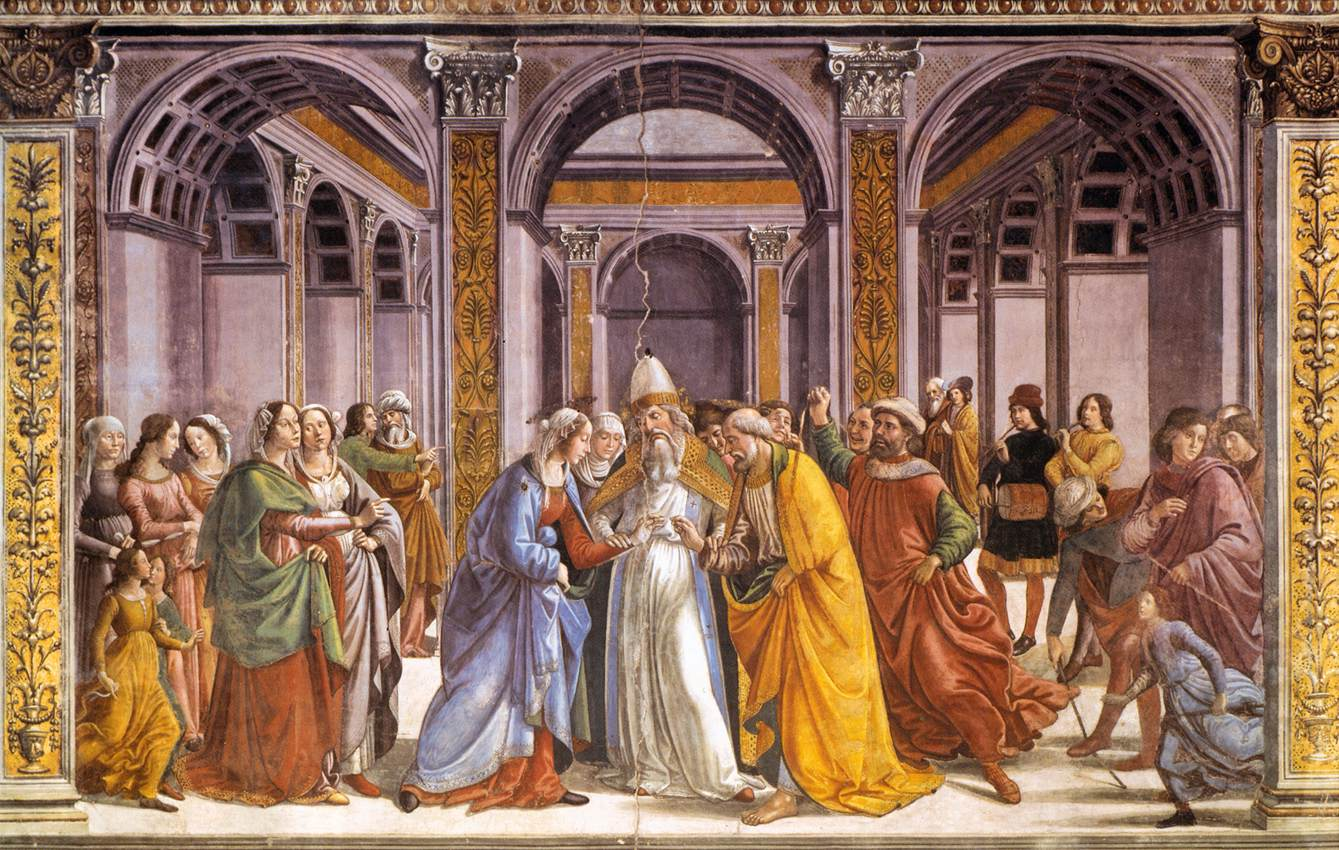
Marriage of Mary by Domenico Ghirlandaio, 1485-1490, at the Tornabuoni Chapel

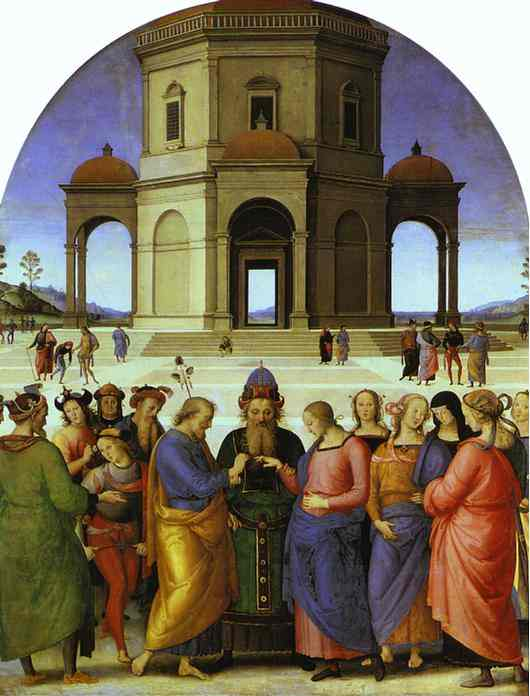
Marriage of the Virgin by Perugino, 1500-1504

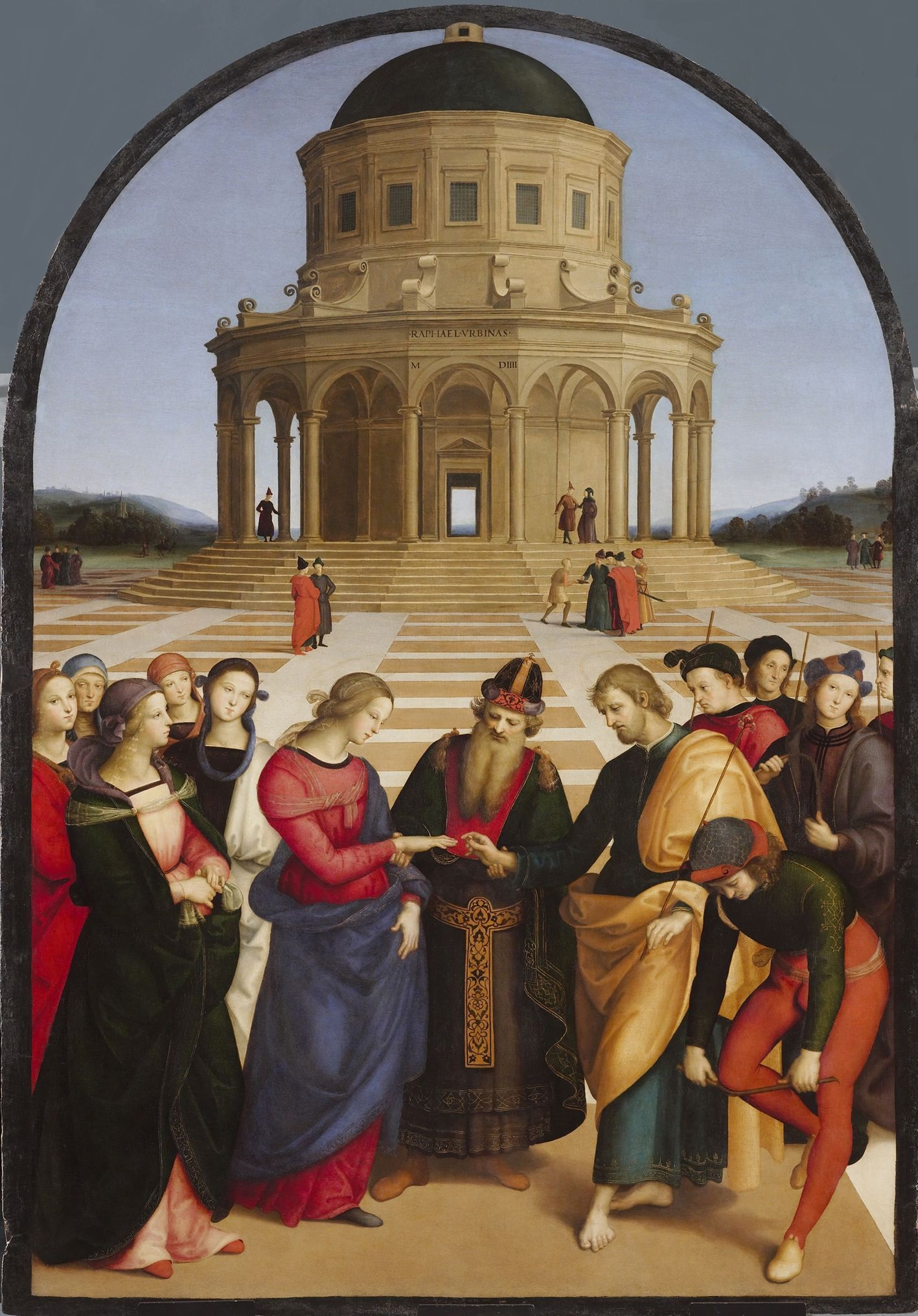
The Marriage of the Virgin by Raphael, 1504

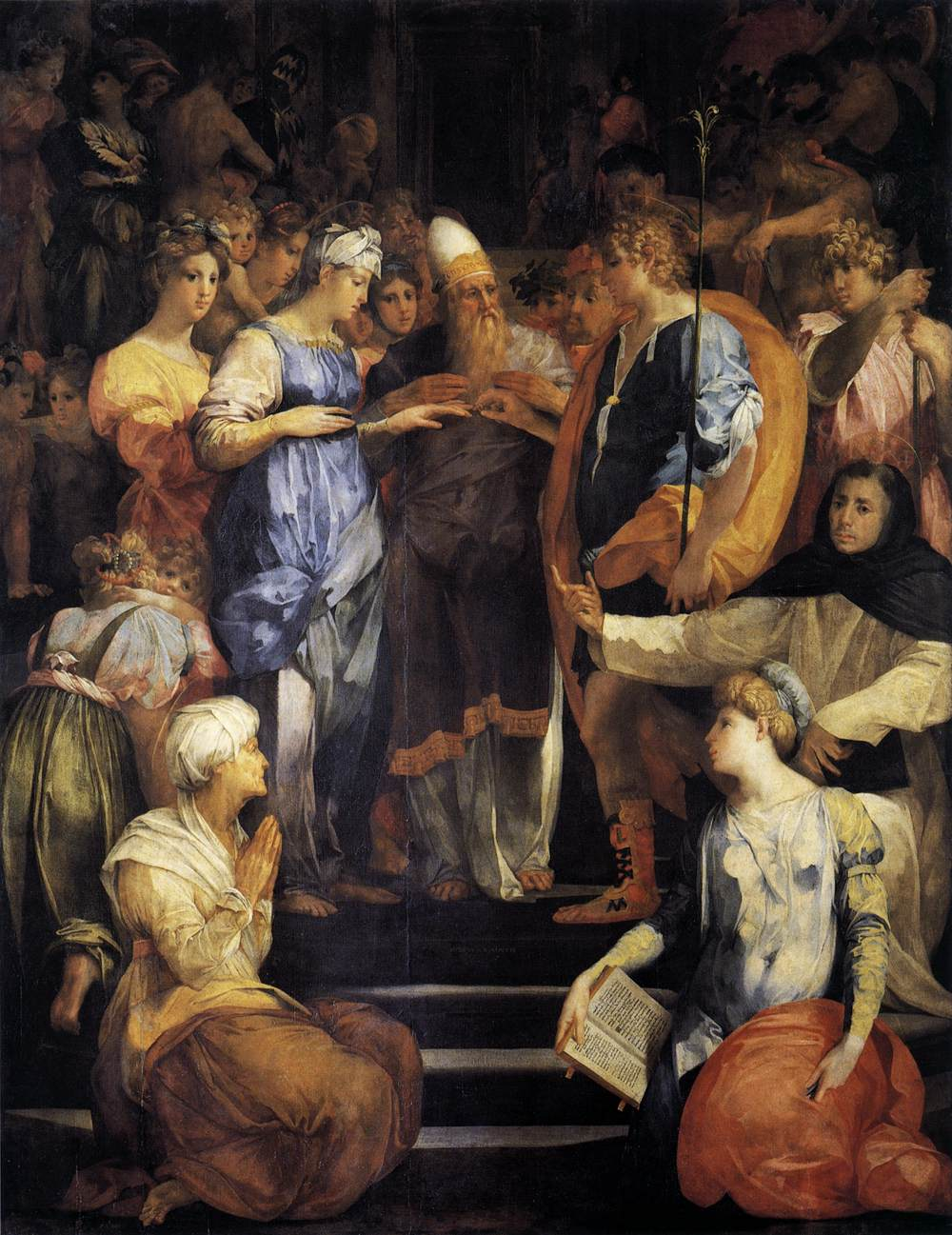
Betrothal of the Virgin by Rosso Fiorentino, 1523

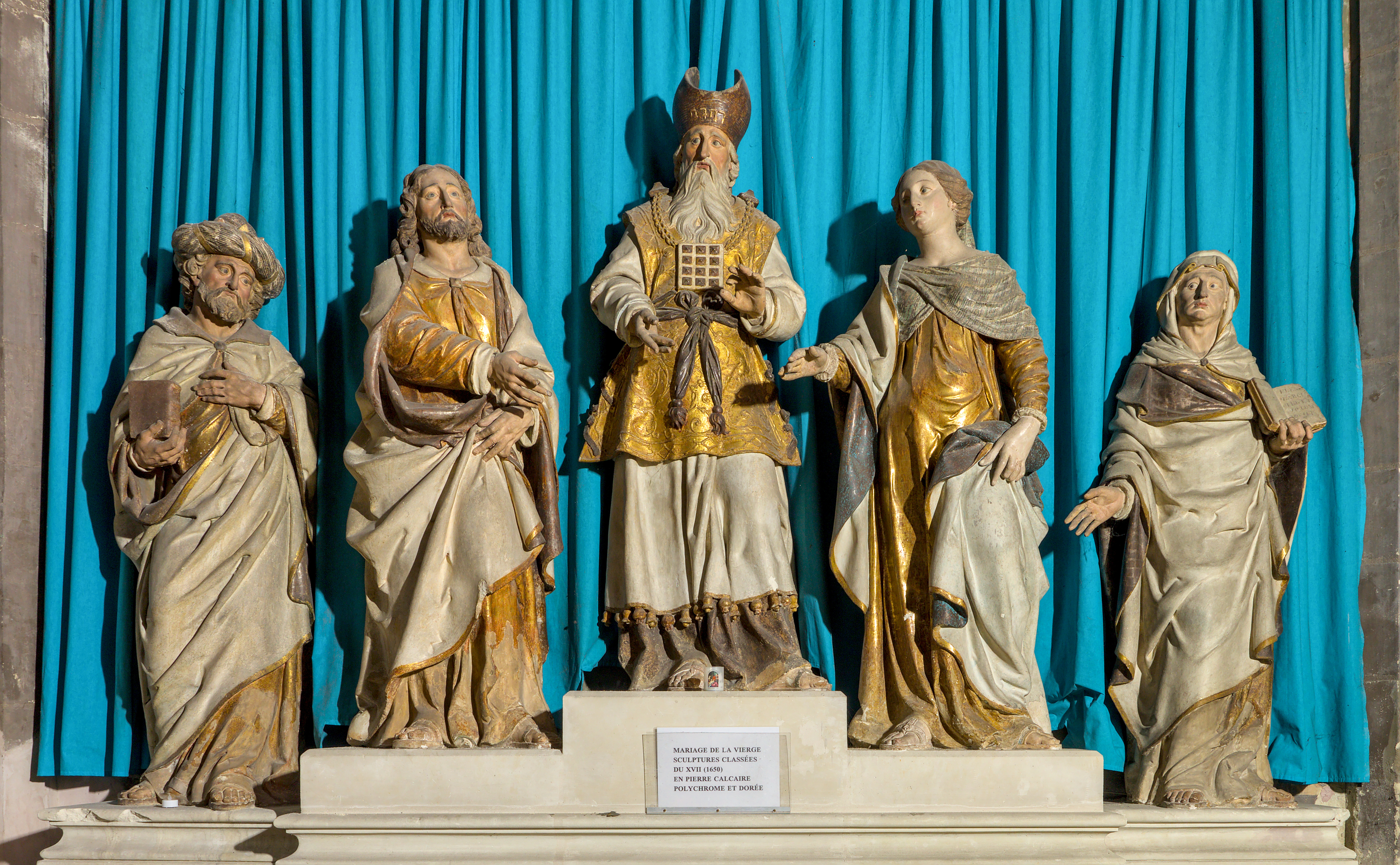
Marriage of the Virgin, wooden sculptures, Notre-Dame-la-Riche Church, Tours, France, 1650
