= Tiburzio Baldini =

Italian painter

Fra Tiburzio Baldini (early 17th century) was an Italian painter of the Baroque period. He was born in Bologna, and painted for the churches and convents at Brescia, including a Marriage of the Virgin with St. Joseph and the Murder of the Innocents in the church of Santa Maria delle Grazie.
