= Francesco Barbieri =

Italian painter

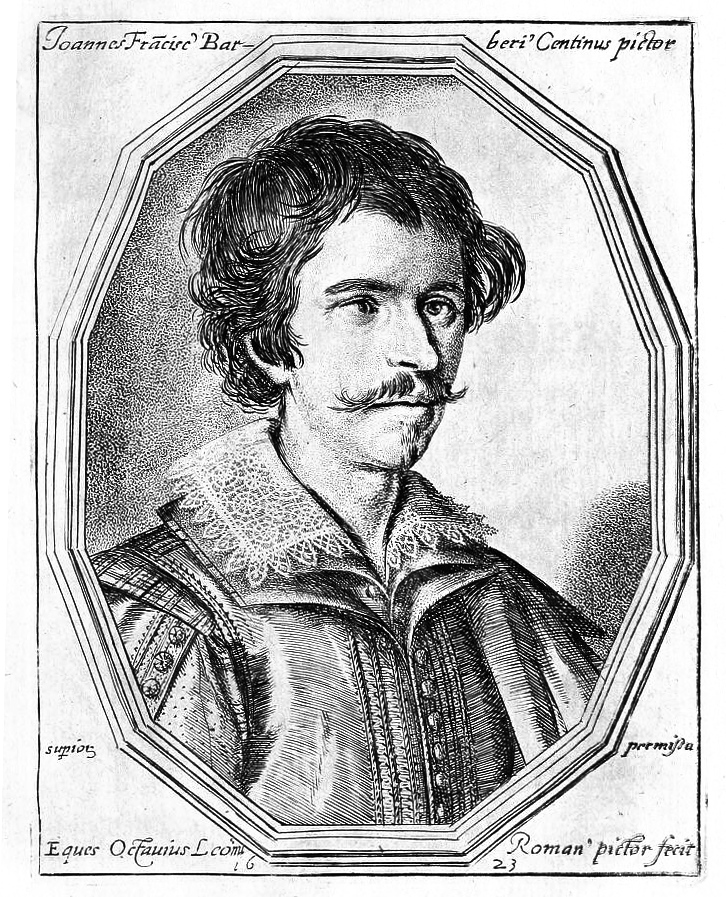
Francesco Barbieri (1623–1698)

Francesco Barbieri (1623–1698), also known as il Legnano, was an Italian painter of the Baroque period. He died in Verona. He trained with Antonio Gandini and Pietro Ricchi. He painted historical and landscape canvases.
