= Tommaso Bona =

Italian painter

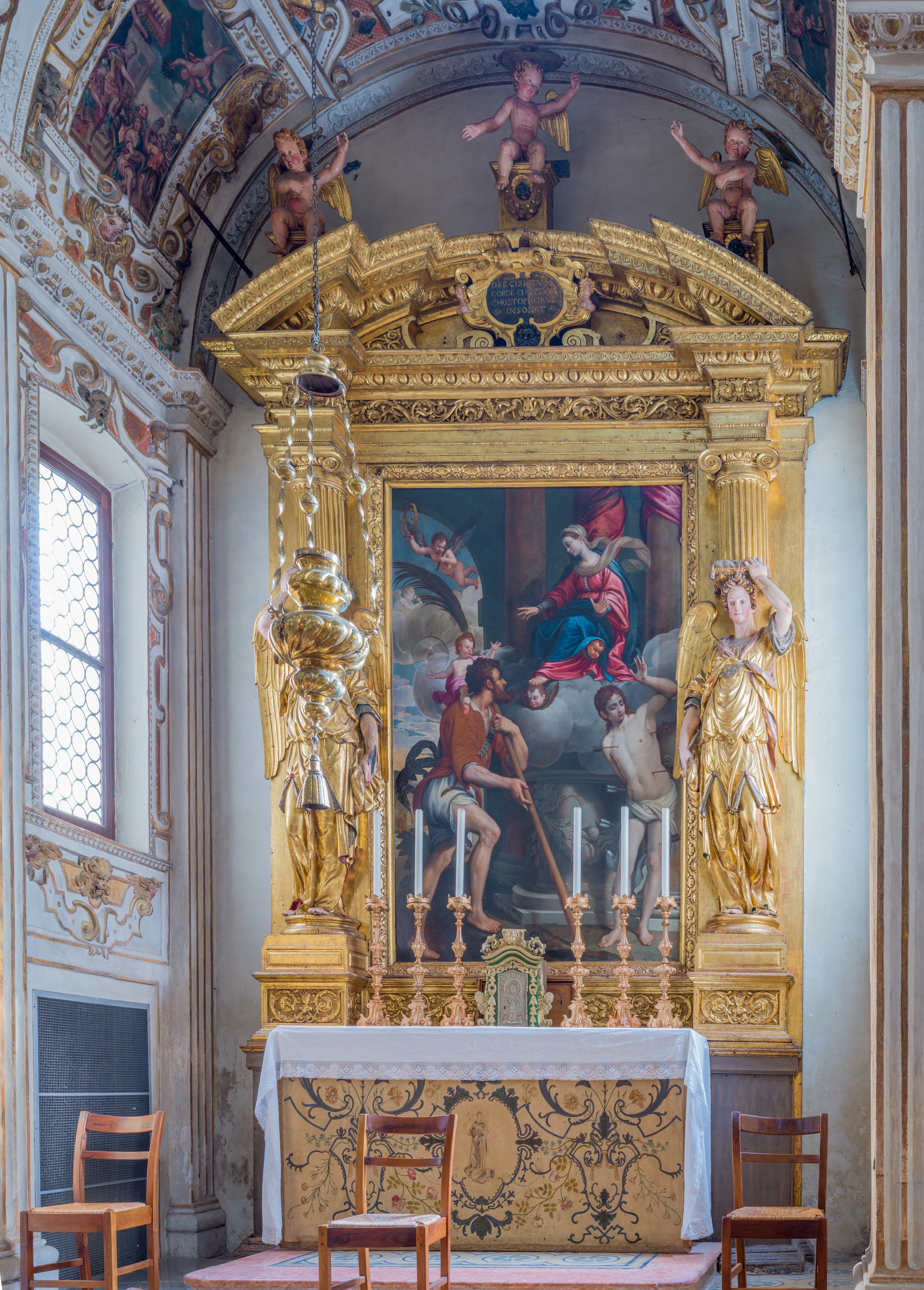
Altarpiece by Tommaso Bona with Virgin and Saint Christopher and Saint Peter in the Santa Maria Annunziata church in Salò.

Tommaso Bona (second half 16th century) was an Italian painter of the Renaissance period, mainly active in Brescia.

He painted a Magdalen for the church of the Annunziata in Brescia. He was influenced by the style of Tintoretto. In 1577, along with Pietro Marone, he painted the nave of the Duomo Vecchio of San Pietro. He also painted in the Sala del Consiglio of the Palazzo della Loggia (signed 18 July 1588). He painted a Nativity once in the sacristy of the church of Santa Maria dei Miracoli in Brescia. He died in Brescia in 1614.
