= Giacomo di Castro =

Italian painter

Giacomo di Castro (1597–1687) was an Italian painter of the Baroque period. He was born at Sorrento. He was a pupil of Giovanni Battista Caracciolo, but afterwards worked under Domenichino when that master visited Naples to decorate the chapel of the Tresoro.

He painted a Marriage of the Virgin, the Annunciation, and Archangel Michael expelling Lucifer from Paradise in Sant' Aniello in Sorrento.
