= Sant'Angela Merici, Brescia =

Roman Catholic church in Brescia, Italy

Coordinates: 45.534446°N 10.225104°E

Sant'Angela Merici
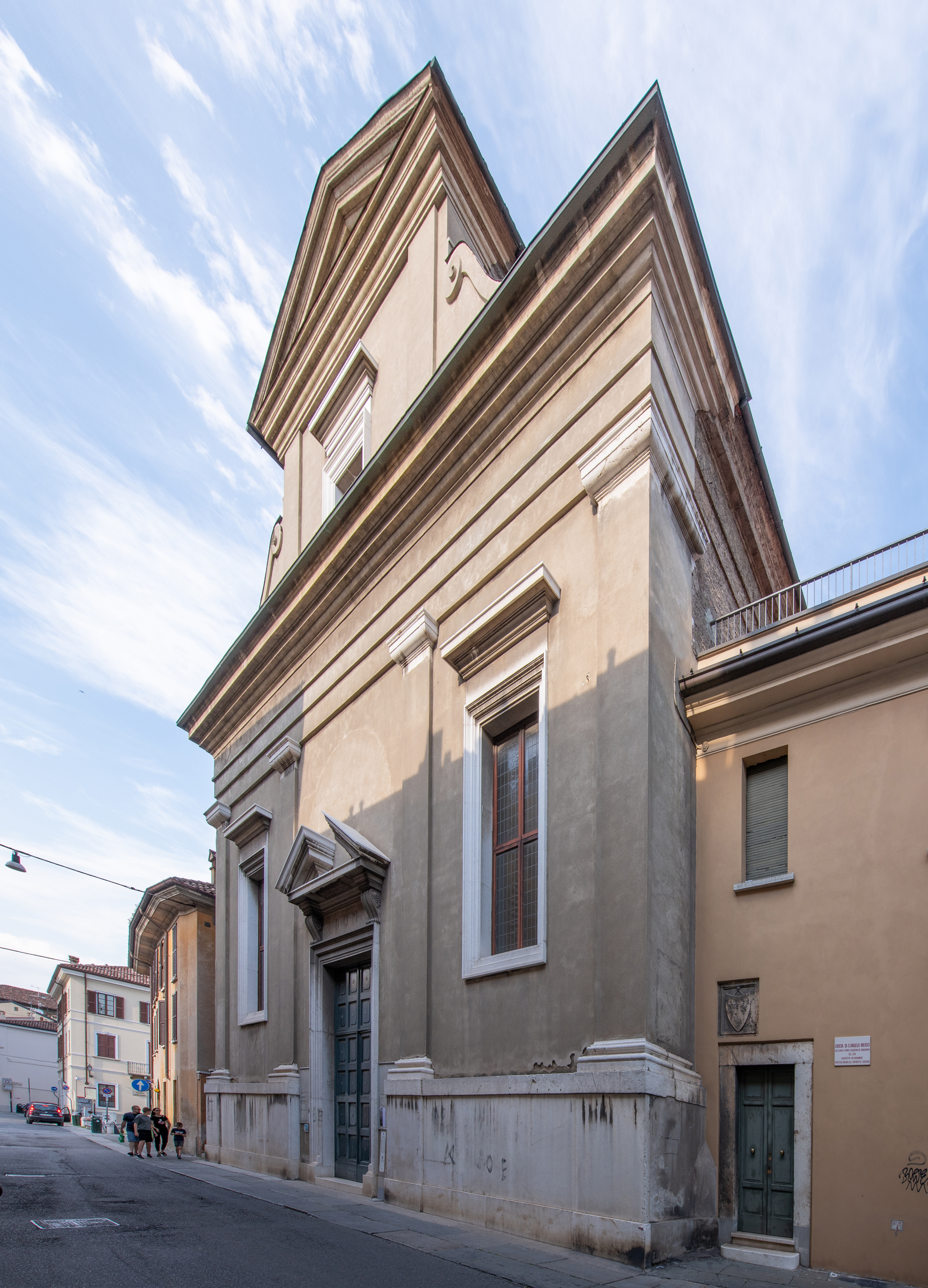
- Façade of the church

Religion
- Affiliation: Roman Catholic

Location
- Location: Brescia, Italy
- Interactive map of Sant'Angela Merici

Architecture
- Type: Church
- Style: Renaissance
- Completed: Reconstructed after World War Two

Sant'Angela Merici is a Renaissance style, Roman Catholic church located on Via Francesco Crispi, in central Brescia, region of Lombardy, Italy.

== History ==
It was once known as the church of Sant'Afra, and thus was often confused with the distinct Sant'Afra in Sant'Eufemia, which now known by just Sant'Afra. The present church of Sant'Angela Merici was also known as the church of San Faustino ad Sanguinem.

The site known as the cemetery of San Latino and was venerated for centuries as the location for the burials of many Christian martyrs. The church is the burial site of Saint Angela Merici, founder of the Order of Ursulines. In the 1500s, a church was built at the site. After near complete destruction by bombardments during the Second World War, the structure was reconstructed, “as it was and where it was”.

The paintings from the interior had been stored in safety during the war, and thus the church contains works by Pietro Maria Bagnadore, Grazio Cossali, Palma the Younger, Giulio Cesare Procaccini, Pietro Marone, Federico Barocci, and a polyptych by Paolo Caylina the Younger. It contains a ‘’Baptism of Saint Afra’’ by Francesco Bassano the Younger and a Transfiguration by Tintoretto. The crypt contains paleochristian burial sites.

== Views ==
Facade

View from Piazza Moretto

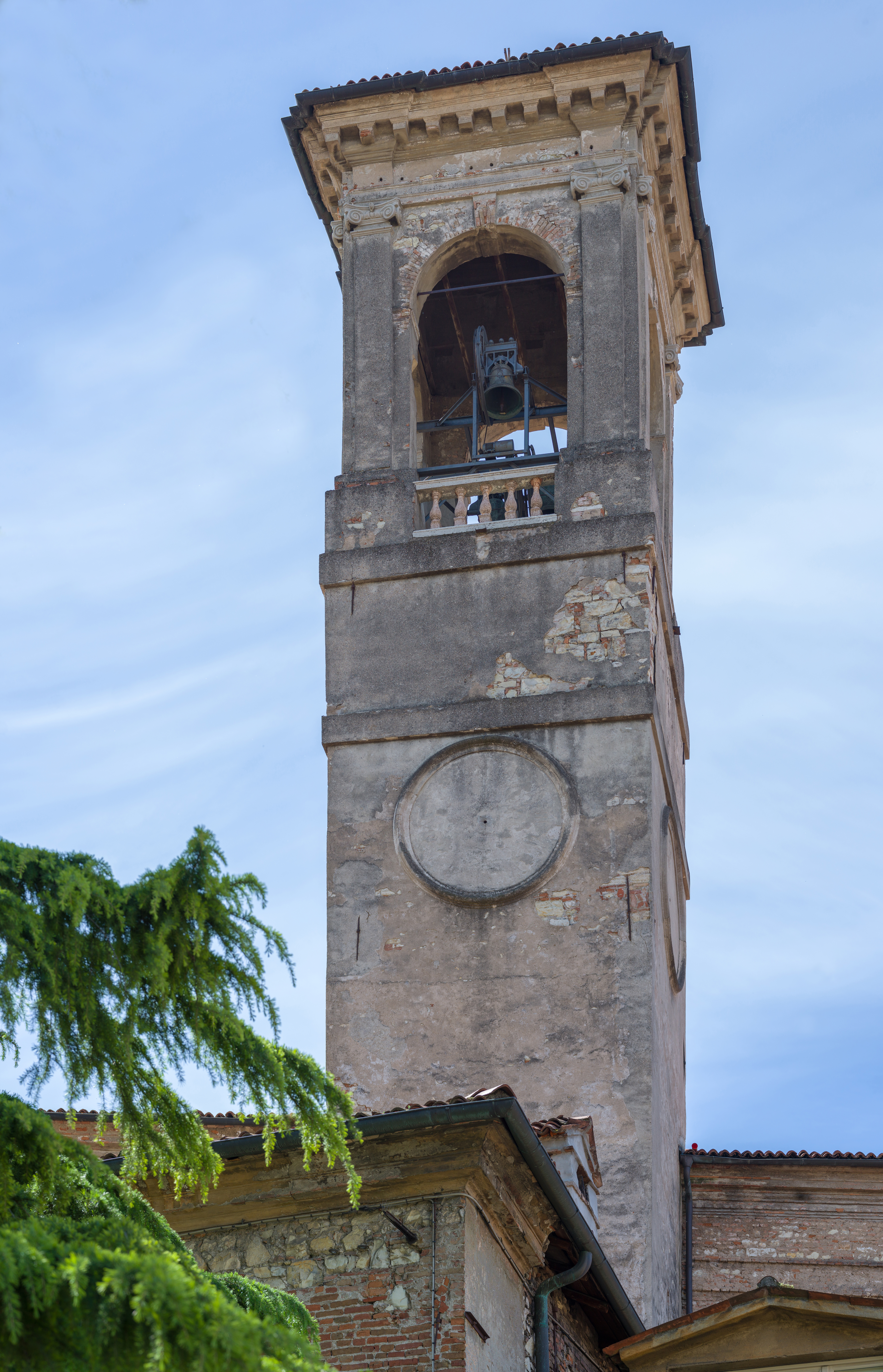
Tower

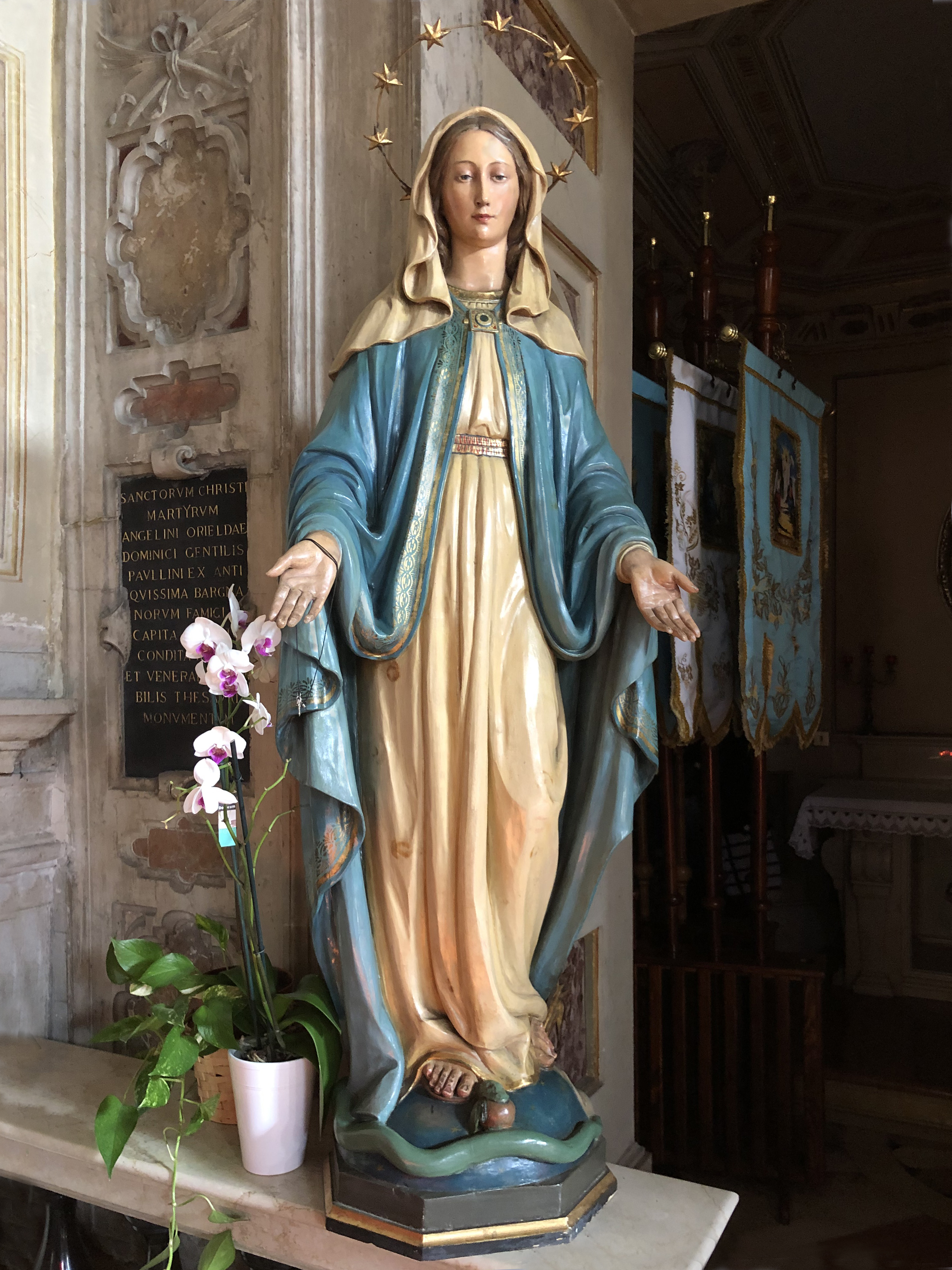
Woodcarved polichromed statue of the Virgin Mary

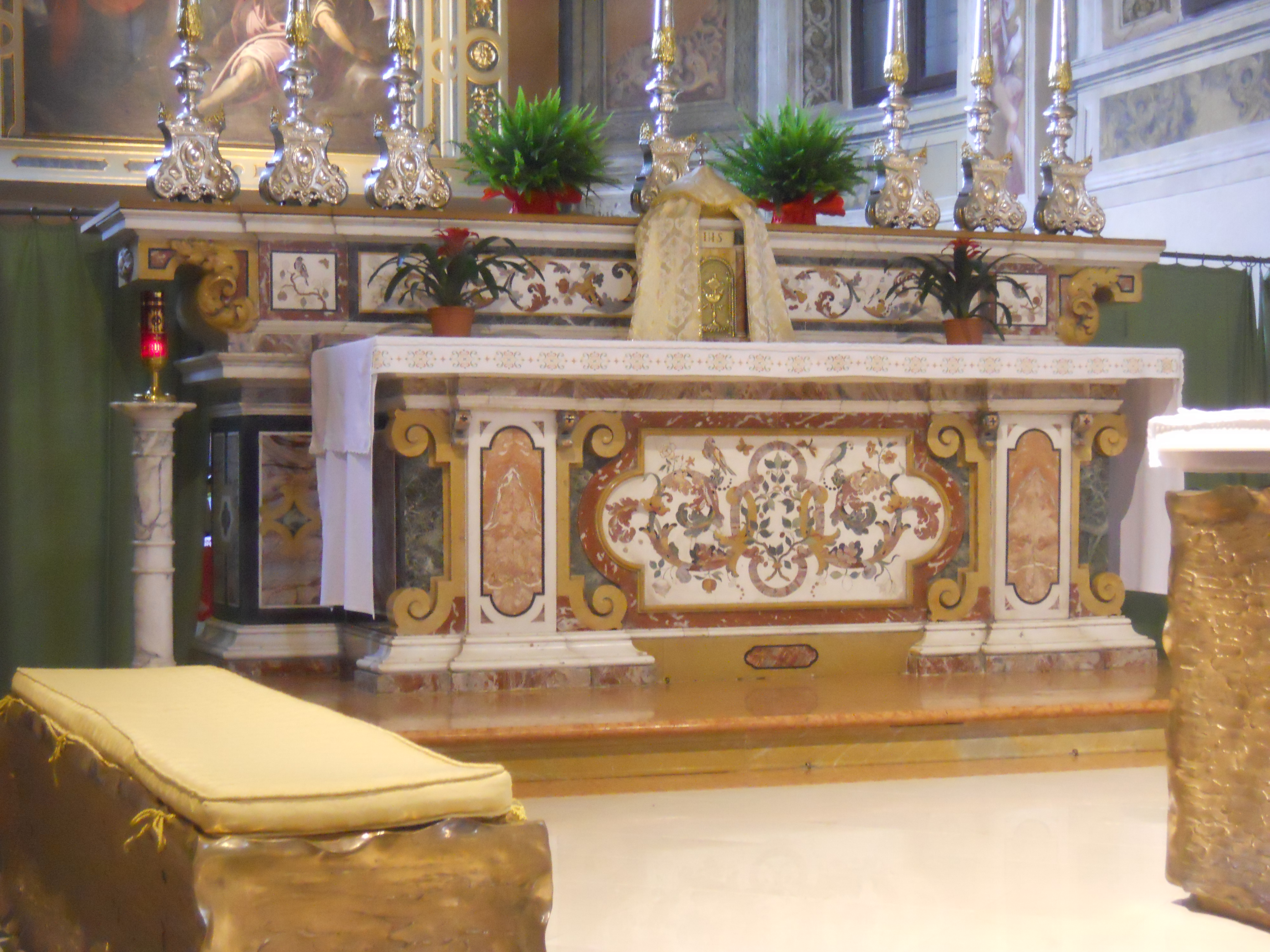
Altar

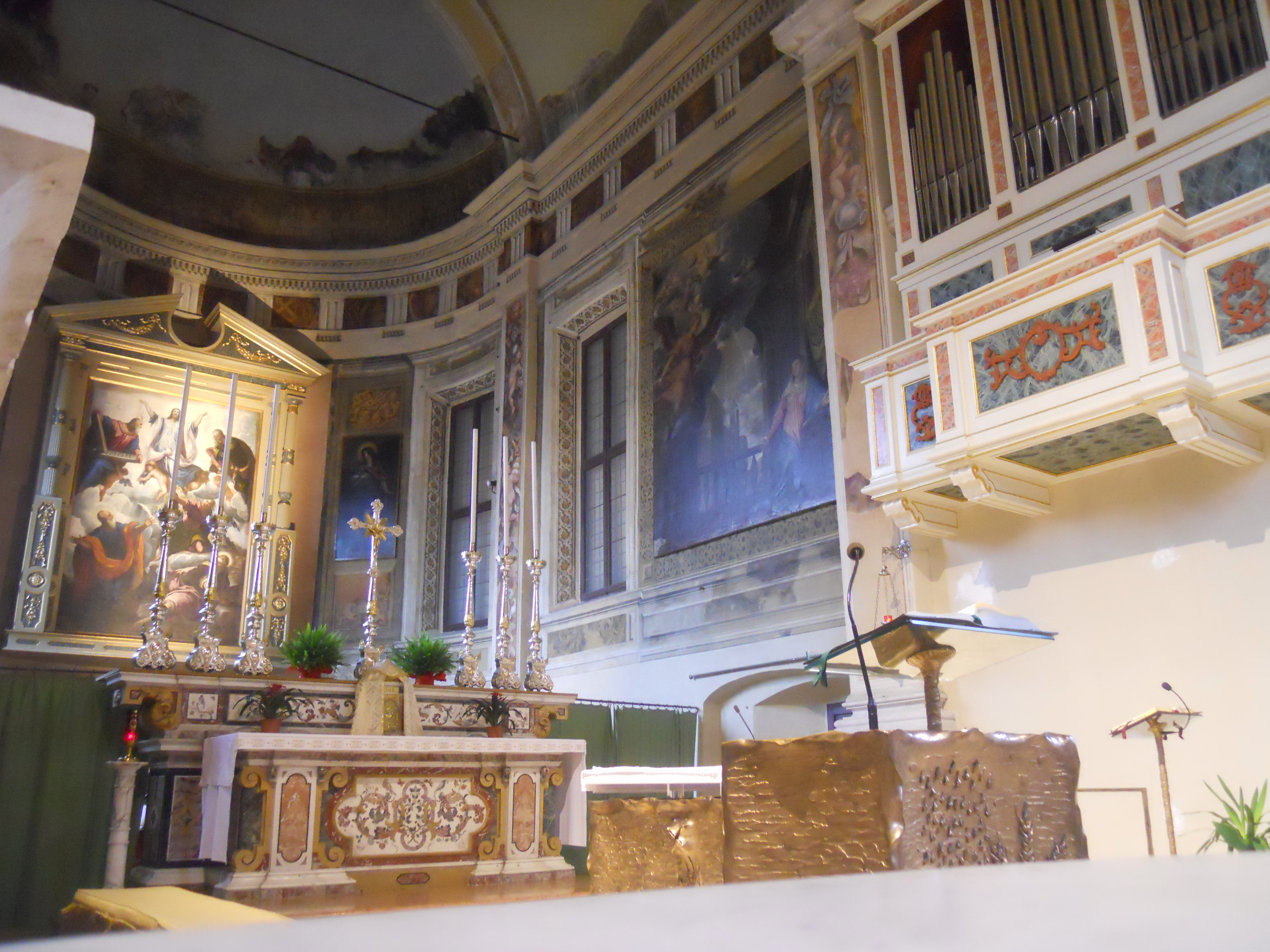
Interior

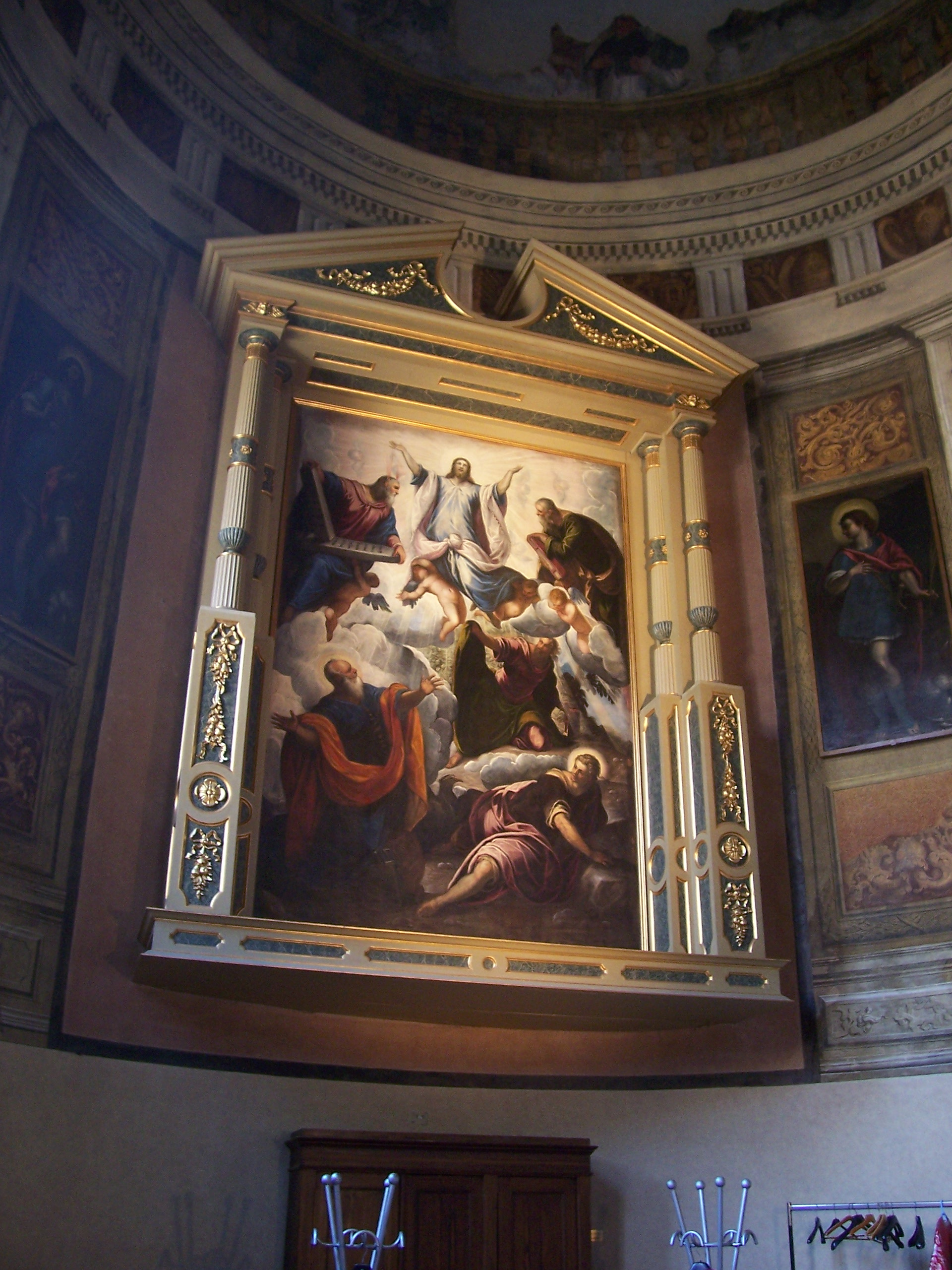
Trasfigurazione by Tintoretto

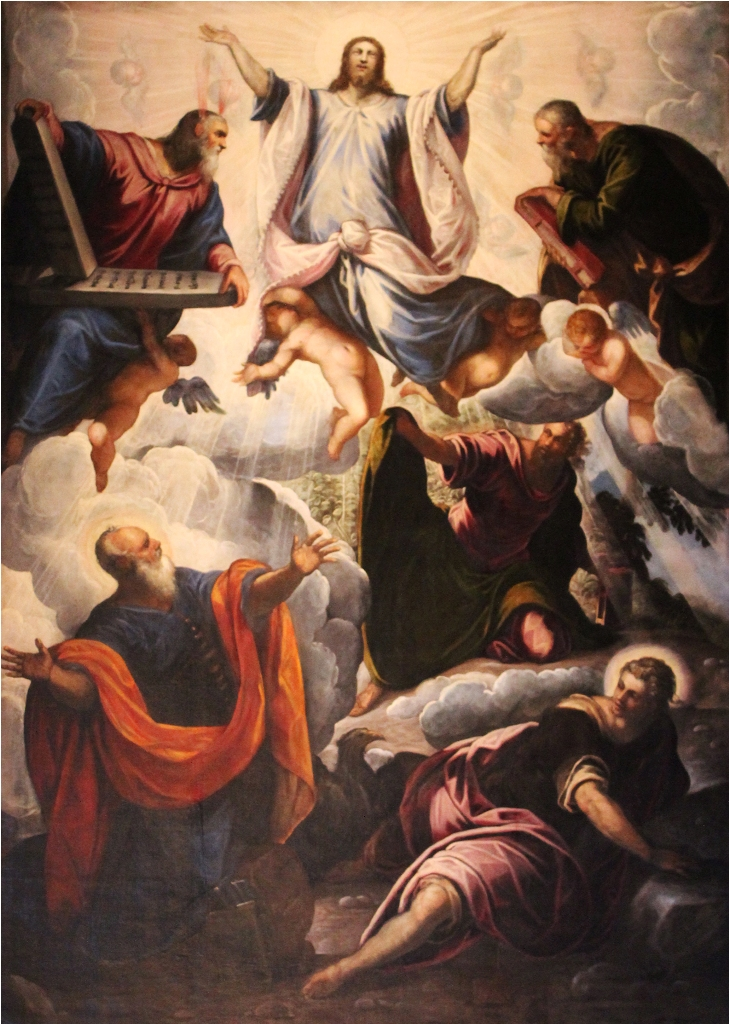
View of Trasfigurazione

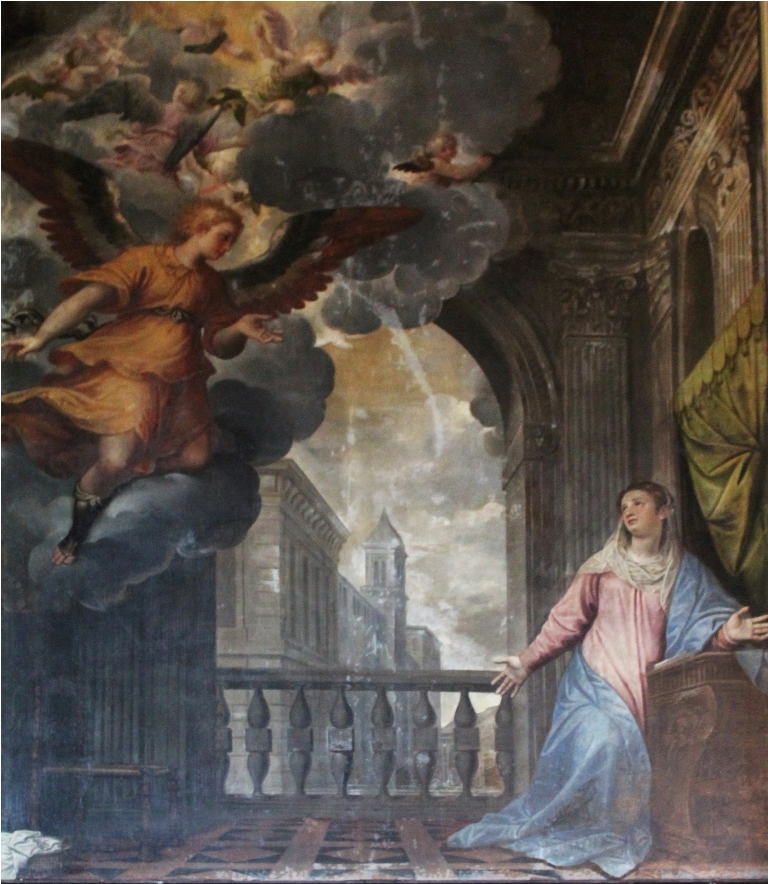
Annunciazione by Pietro Marone

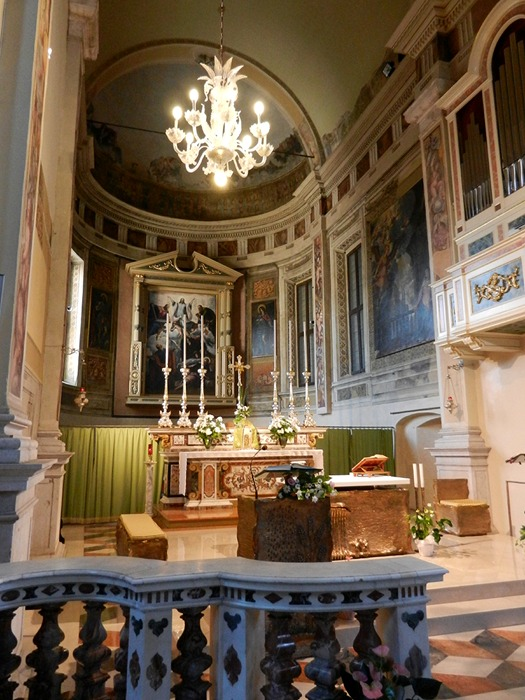
Nave
