= Barrueco =

Barrueco is a surname. Notable people with the surname include:

- Barrueco (musician) (born Wilfried Ange Barrueco in 1974), French pop singer-songwriter
- Manuel Barrueco (born 1952), Cuban classical guitarist
- Ricardo Fernández Barrueco (born 1965), Venezuelan businessman
