= Antonio Gandini =

Italian painter

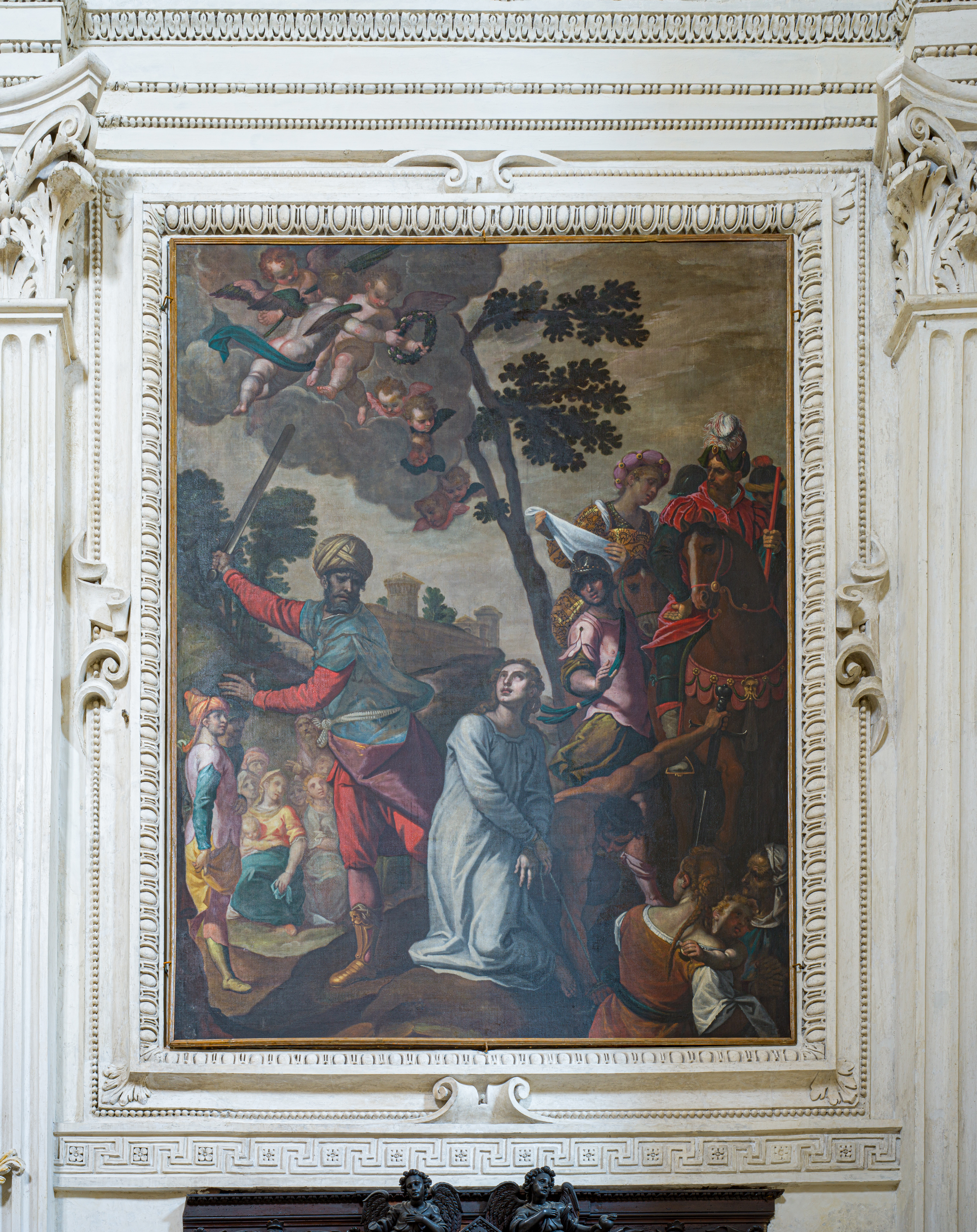
Martyrdom of Saint Barbara by Antonio Gandino in the Chiesa di San Gaetano church in Brescia

Antonio Gandini (1565 – 17 July 1630) was an Italian painter of the late-Renaissance period. He was a pupil of the painter Paolo Veronese. In Brescia, his pupils were Ottavio Amigoni, Francesco Barbieri (il Legnano), and Ambrogio Besozzi. He worked alongside Giacomo Barucco. Gandini's son, Bernardino (died 1651), was also a painter.
