= Francesco Giugno =

Italian painter

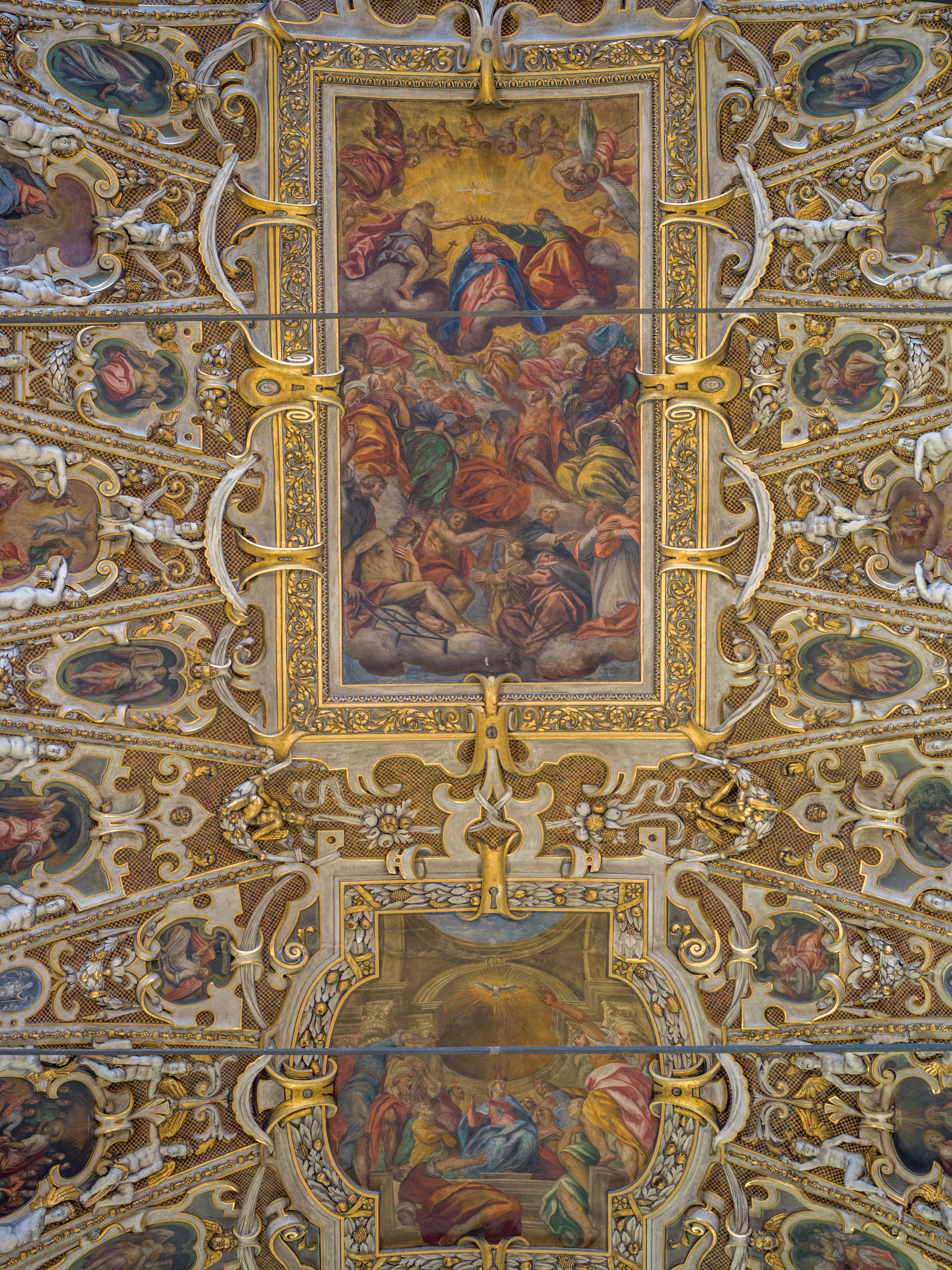
Frescos of the barrel vault by Francesco Giugno in the Santa Maria delle Grazie church in Brescia.

Francesco Giugno (1577 - c. 1621) was an Italian painter of the late Mannerist and early-Baroque periods, mainly active in Brescia and Mantua.

Born in Brescia, he became a pupil of Pietro Marone, and then of Palma il Giovane. He died in Mantua.
