= Camillo Rama =

Italian painter

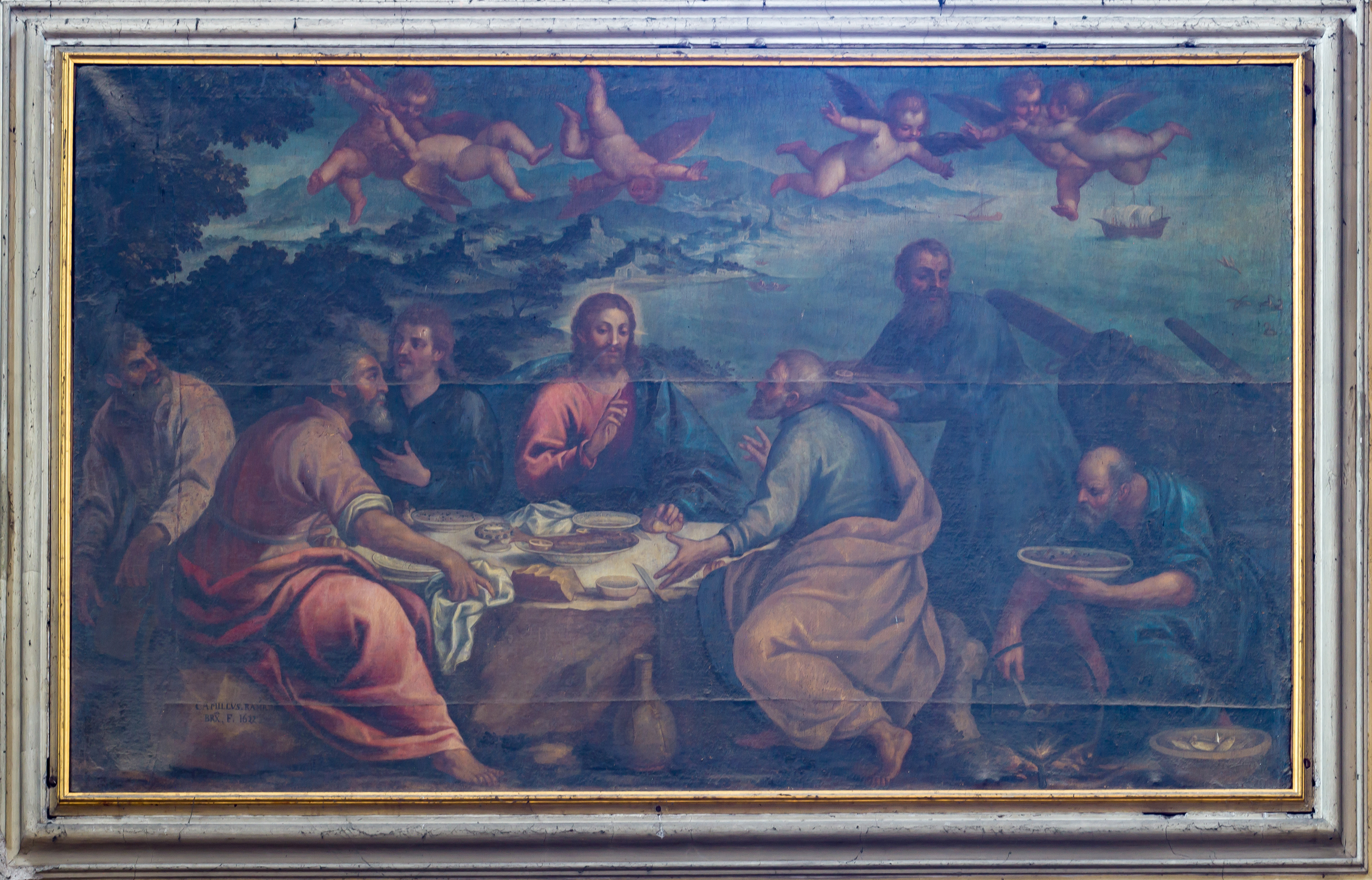
Painting of Christ with the fishermen by Camillo Rama in the Saint Afra church in Brescia

Camillo Rama (1586 – c. 1627) was an Italian painter, active in his native city of Brescia.

He was the pupil of Palma il Giovane, and painted several altarpieces in Brescia. He also painted works for the refectory of the Carmelites, and for the churches of San Giuseppe and San Francesco. In 1610, he also painted for the Stanze of the Palazzo del Capitano in Brescia.

He died in Brescia.
