= Enea Salmeggia =

Italian painter

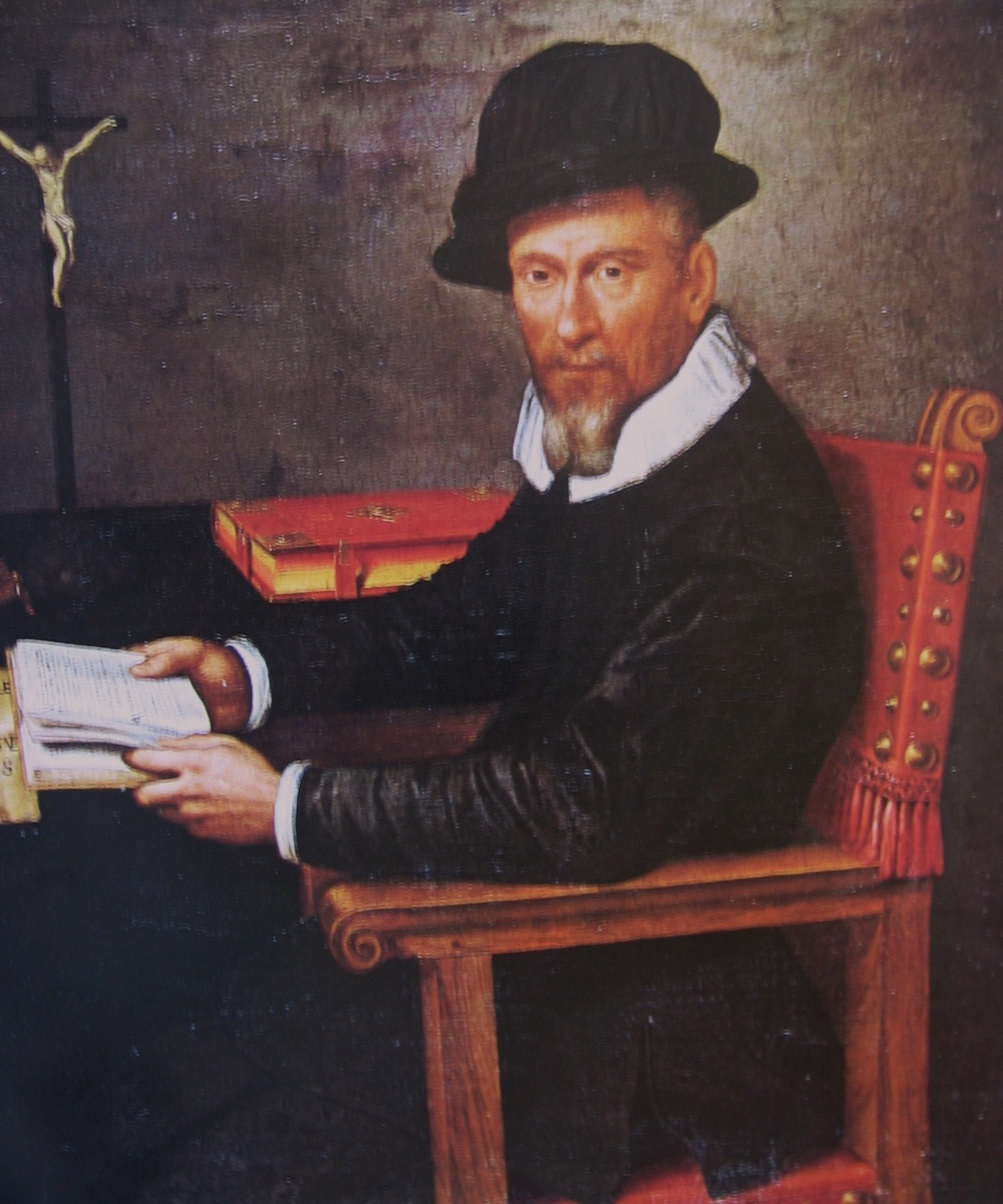
Portrait of a Gentleman, in Bergamo's Accademia Carrara

Enea Salmeggia (c. 1556 – 25 February 1626) was an Italian painter of the late-Renaissance period, active mainly in his native city of Bergamo.

== Biography ==
He was also known as Il Talpino. He trained with members of the Campi family, and later with members of the Procaccini family in Milan. For the church of the Passion in Milan, he painted a Christ’s Agony in the Garden and a Flagellation. His Virgin and child with saints Roch and others is found in the Brera Gallery. An Adoration of the Magi (1595) was painted for Santa Maria Maggiore, Bergamo. He painted a Deposition for San Leonardo de’ Padri Somaschi. He also painted a Madonna enthroned with San Domenico and others for the church of Santa Marta. The parish church of San Martino in Nembro has 27 paintings by him.
