= Pietro Marone =

Italian painter

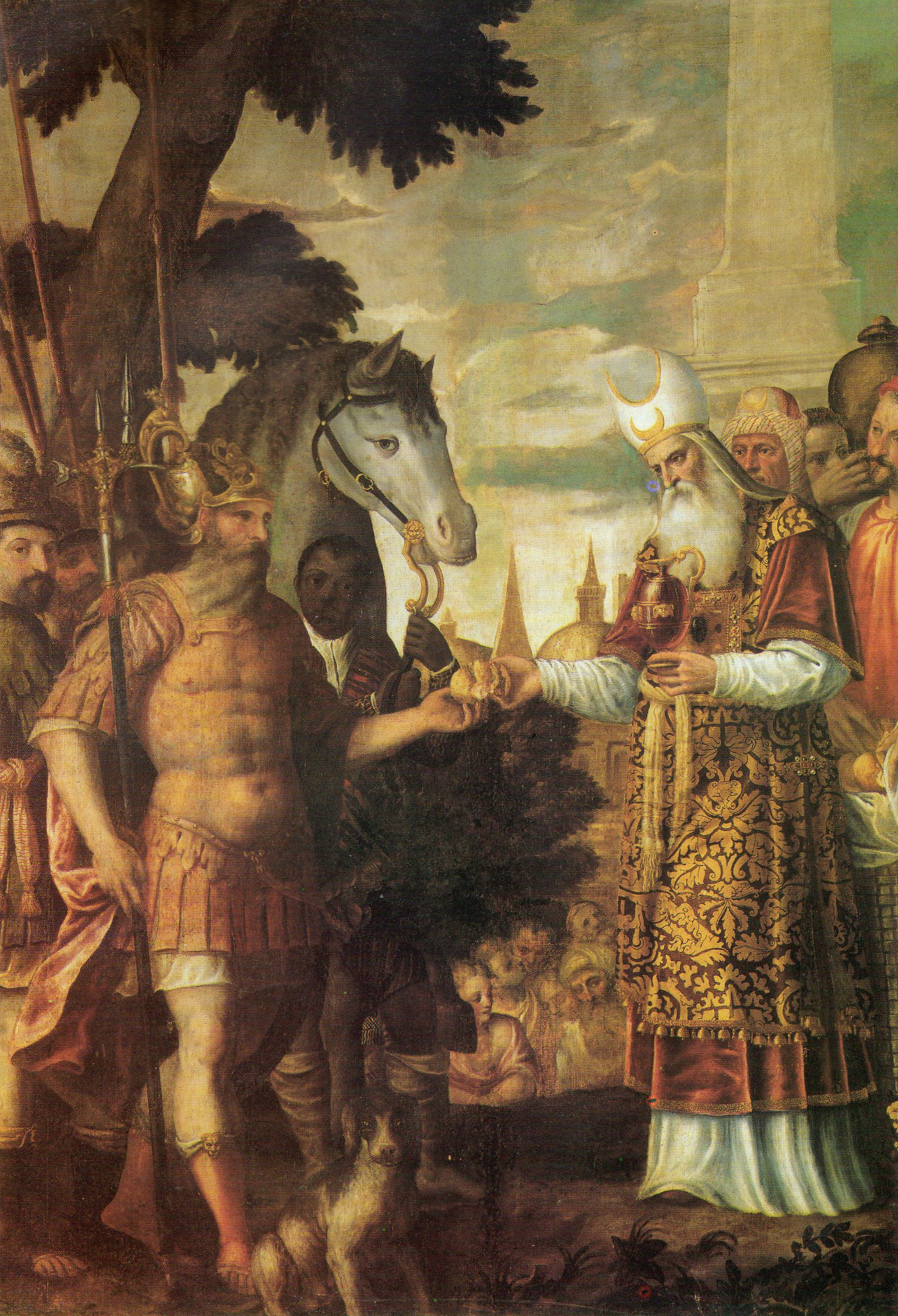
Pietro Marone, The Meeting of Abraham with Melchizedek , Church of San Lorenzo, Brescia, Italy

Pietro Marone (late 16th century) was an Italian painter of the late-Renaissance periods, mainly active in Brescia and Mantua.

Marone was the son of Pietro Marone the Elder, a painter who was the mentor of Francesco Giugno. Pietro the Younger was also the nephew of Andrea Marone, a Latin poet in the court of Pope Leo X. Pietro allegedly admired and followed the styles of or studied with Paolo Veronese and late-Titian and was known for having worked on scenes from the Iliad on the walls of the Palazzo Caprioli in contrada delle Grazie. In 1581, he painted with Tommaso Bona in San Pietro (Duomo Vecchio); in 1588, he worked in the sala del consiglio nel palazzo della Loggia, and in 1591, helped decorate some festive arches celebrating the visit of Cardinal Gianfrancesco Morosini on his return after serving as nuncio to France.
