= Saint-Médard, Paris =

Church in Paris, France

Saint-Médard
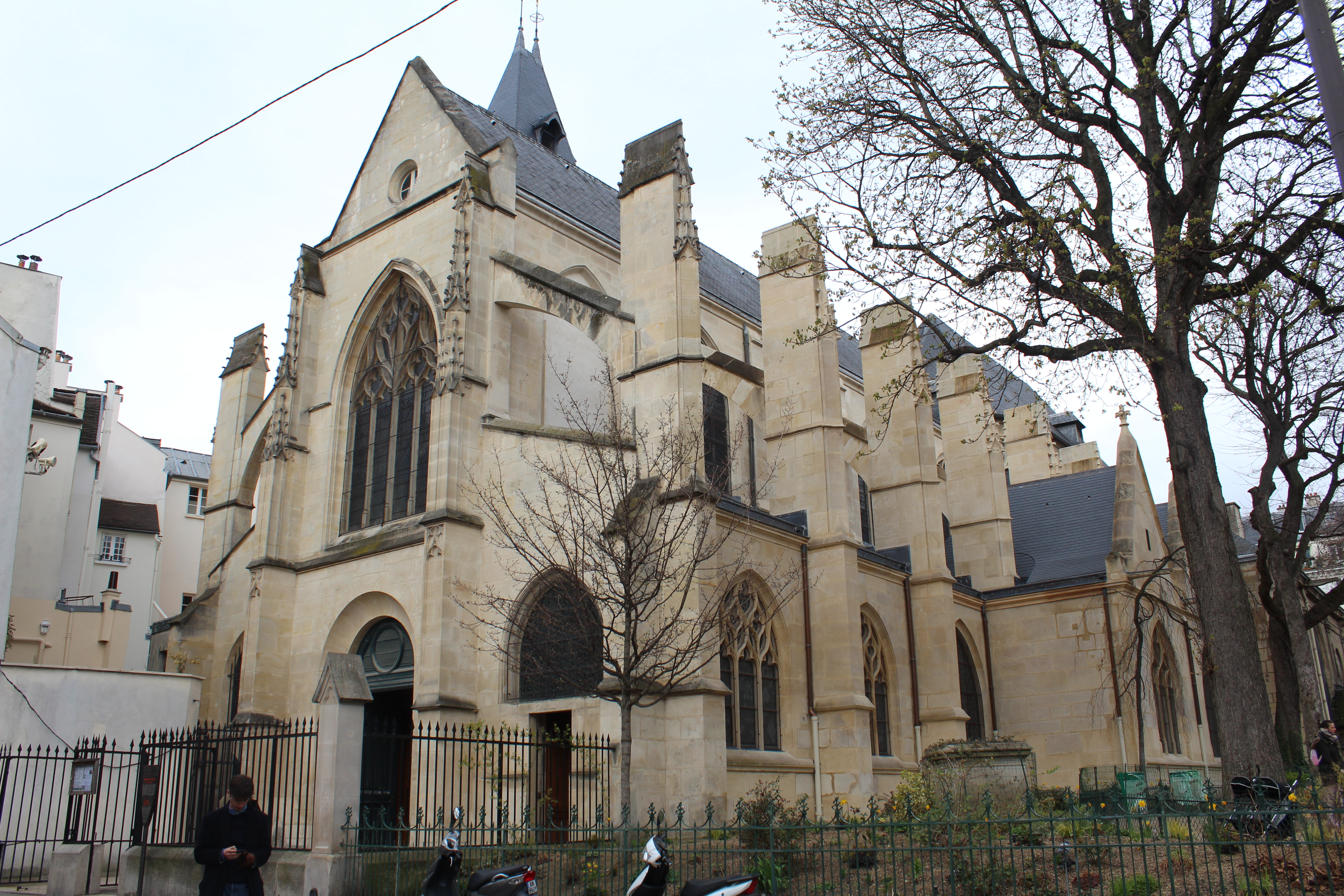
- Saint-Médard, Paris

Religion
- Affiliation: Catholic Church
- Province: Archdiocese of Paris
- Rite: Roman Catholic

Location
- Location: 141 Rue Mouffetard, 5th arrondissement, Paris
- Interactive map of Saint-Médard
- Coordinates: 48°51′8″N 2°20′50″E

Architecture
- Type: Church
- Style: Flamboyant, Neoclassical
- Completed: 15th−18th century

The Church of Saint-Médard (French: Église Saint-Médard, pronounced [eɡliz sɛ̃medaʁ]) is a Roman Catholic church located at 141 Rue Mouffetard in the 5th arrondissement of Paris. It takes its name from Saint Medard, the bishop of Noyon in northern France, who was protector of Queen Radegund, and helped her found a convent at Noyon to escape her abusive husband, King Chlothar I. Medard is the patron saint of French farmers.

== History ==
Early Christian tombs from the Merovingian period were found by archeologists a few meters from the present church. The cemetery was probably connected with an early oratory from the sixth or seventh century. In the ninth century, following the Norman invasions, there was a chapel dedicated to Saint Medard, close to the route of the Roman road which connected Roman Lutetia with Lyon, near the point where the road crossed the Bievre River. The existence of this church, whose parish was later attached to the Abbey of Saint Genevieve, is documented in a papal bull in 1163 from Pope Alexander III.

Construction of the present church took place from the early or middle of the 15th century until the 18th century. The work was interrupted by the Wars of Religion. In December 1561, the church was the scene of a dispute between Protestants and Catholics which led to the pillage of the church by the Protestants. In 1655, the church was placed directly under the Archbishop of Paris, but kept a close relationship with the nearby Abbey of Saint-Genevieve. In 1683 it became a parish church, within the jurisdiction of the Abbot of Saint-Genevieve. In 1724, the faubourg Sant-Marcel was integrated into the growing city of Paris.

In the 18th century the church came under the influence of a more radical group of clerics known as the Convulsionnaires of Saint-Médard. The Convulsionnaires believed that going into a trance and having convulsions could cure illnesses, and was a valid expression of Christian faith. The church was also frequented by the Jansenists who also expressed non-traditional Catholic doctrines. Prominent Jansenists connected with Saint-Medard included the philosopher-mathematician Blaise Pascal. the theologian Pierre Nicole, and another leading Jansenist theologian, François de Pâris, who was buried in the church cemetery. Followers of the Jansenists and Convulsionnairers met secretly in the cemetery at his grave. The Pope declared Jansenism a heresy, and issued a decree forbidding access to the cemetery. Convulsionnaires were arrested and imprisoned in the Bastille.

In 1784, an ambitious new building program began, under the architect Petit-Radel. The choir was modified and a new axial chapel was added to the apse at the east end. During the French Revolution, the clergy of church were required to take an oath to the civil Constitution, which they did, but, in November 1793, as the Revolution became more radical, the church was shut down by the government. In 1798 it re-opened in a new form as a Constitutional church, with the clergy taking an oath to the government as well as the church. The building was shared between the Catholics and a congregation of revolutionary Christians called Theophilanthropes. They was soon replaced by another Revolutionary church called the Decadire, or Constitutional Catholics. The week was modified from seven to ten days, and on each tenth day it became a Temple of Labor. In 1801, when Napoleon signed a Concordat with the Pope at Notre-Dame, the church was finally restored to the Catholic Church.

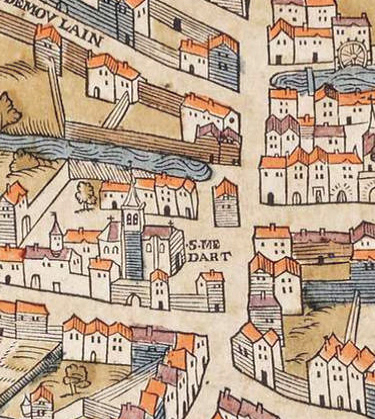
The church on the map of Paris (1550)

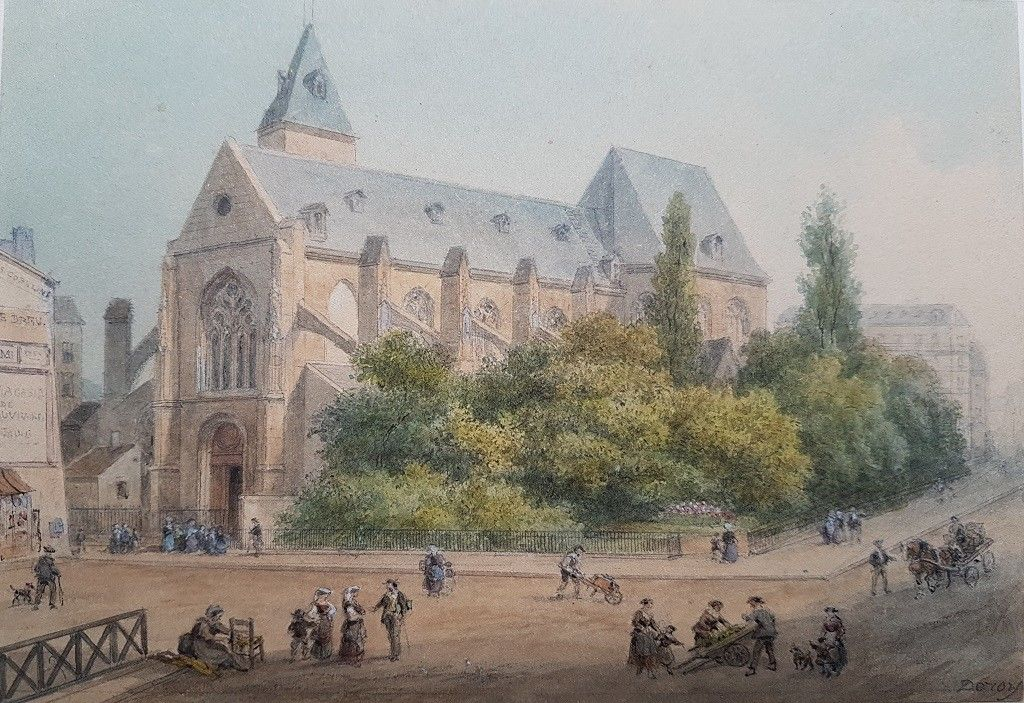
The church in the mid-19th century, by Isidore Deroy

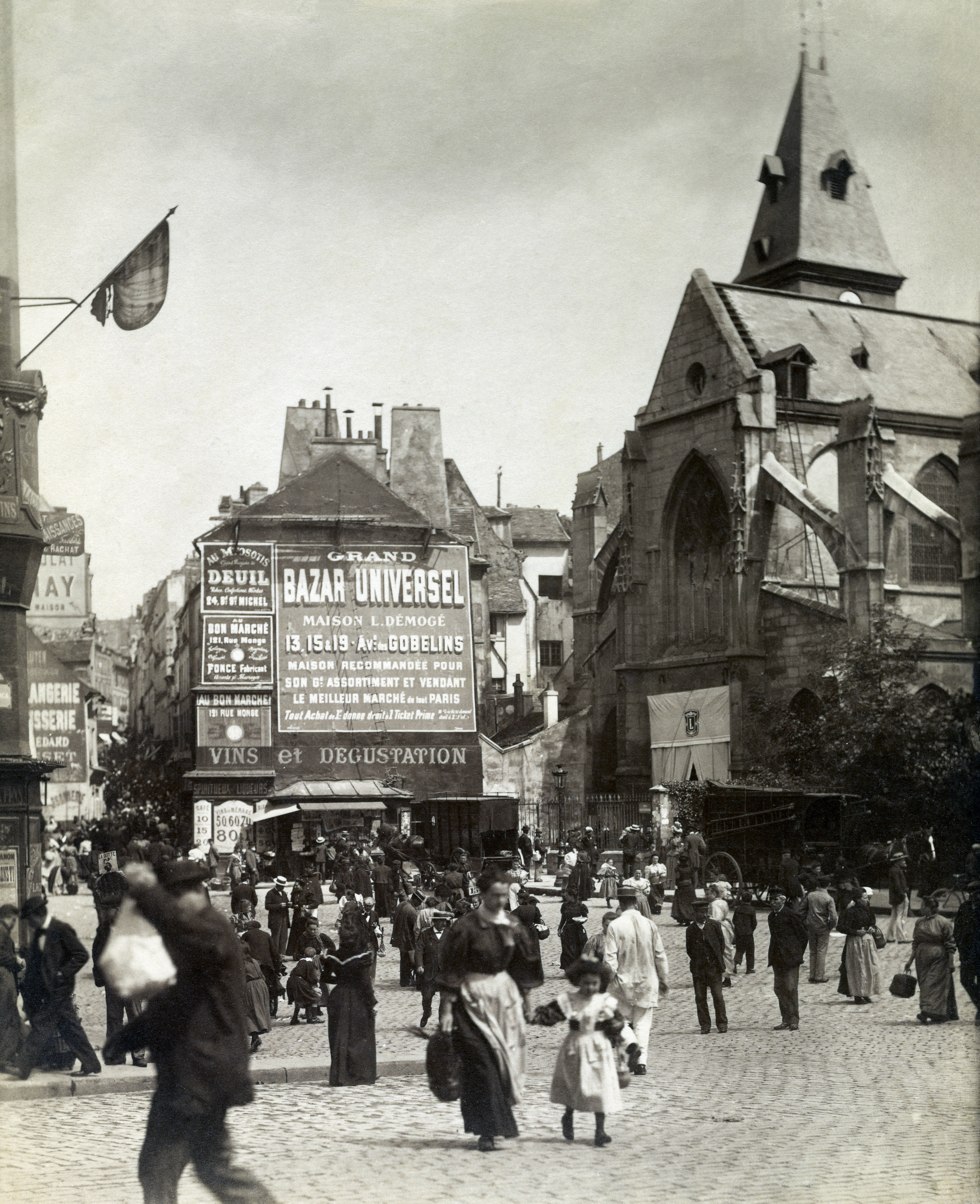
The church in 1898–1900, by Eugene Atget

== Exterior ==
The exterior is a somewhat awkward collection of architecture; the flying buttresses are supported by very massive abutments, but do not align with the chapels alongside the church, indicating that the chapels were built afterwards. The sides of the church are lined by rows of trees, and the building is difficult to see except in winter.

The west front, facing rue Mouffetard, features a large bay filled with a large Flamboyant Gothic window, flanked by Flamboyant pinnacles, dating the upper facade to the 15th century. However, the lower part of the facade, rebuilt in the 18th century and again in the 19th century, has no decoration or architectural distinction. Some architectural historians believe that the original facade resembled that of Saint-Nicolas-des Champs in the 3rd arrondissement.

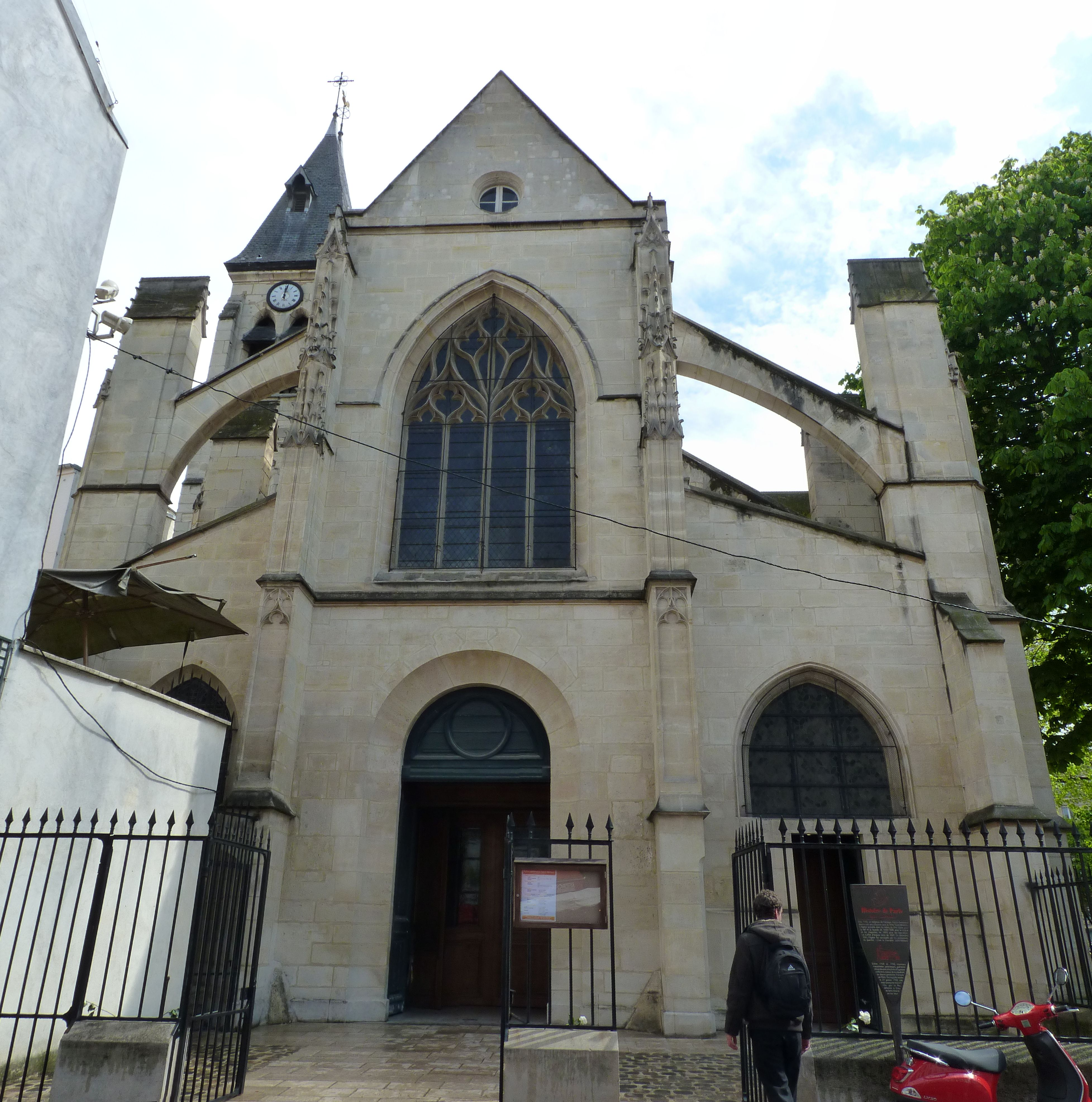
The west front, with Flamboyant window and decoration

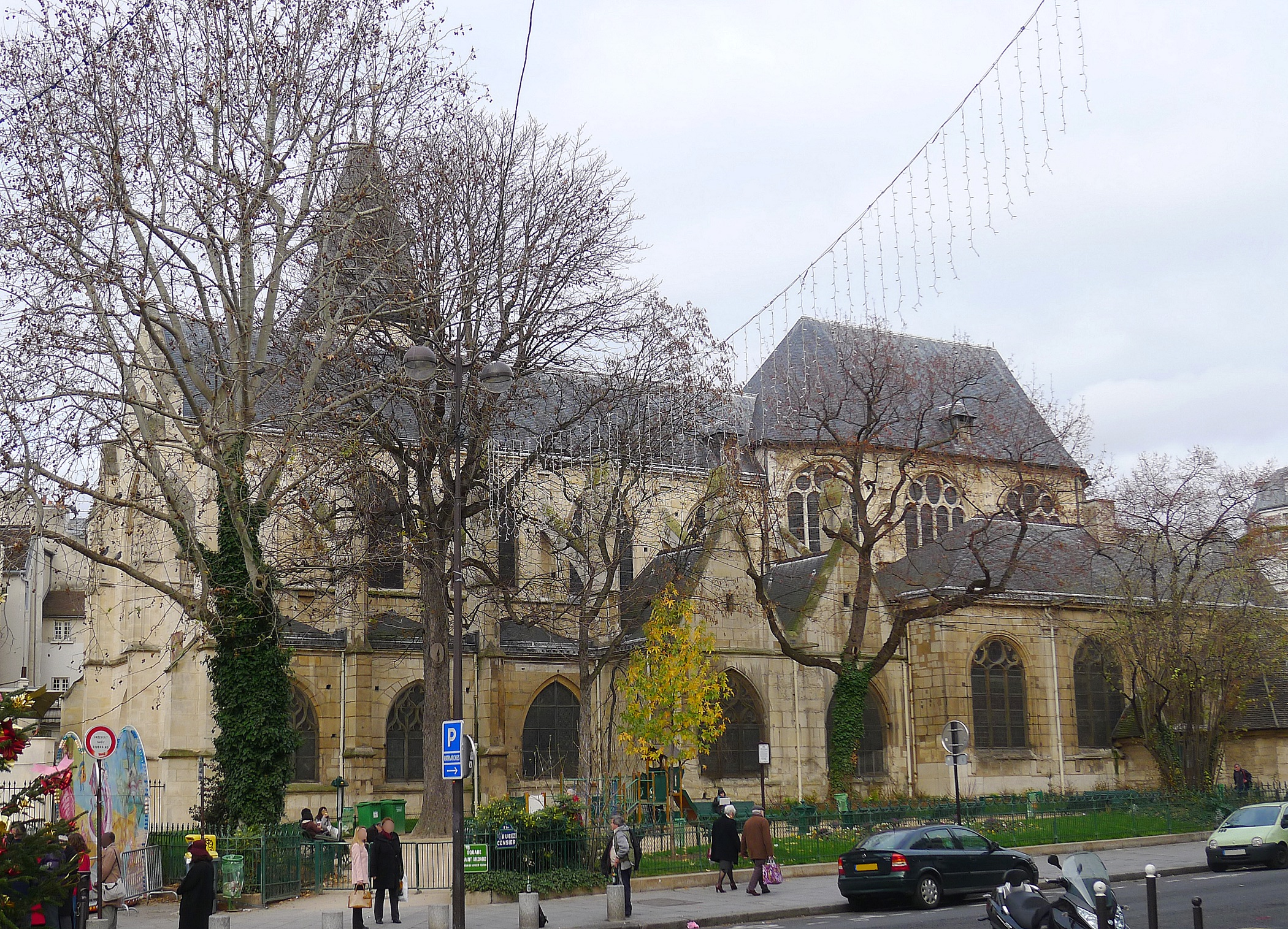
South side of the church, hidden by trees

== The plan and the interior ==
The nave and the western front were built in the middle of the 15th century. The west front was extensively changed in the 18th and 19th century, and the lower portions were entirely redesigned. The choir, the portion of church at the east end where the clergy worships, was constructed between 1562 and 1620. The Chapel of the Virgin, the axial chapel at the east end of the church, was added in 1784.

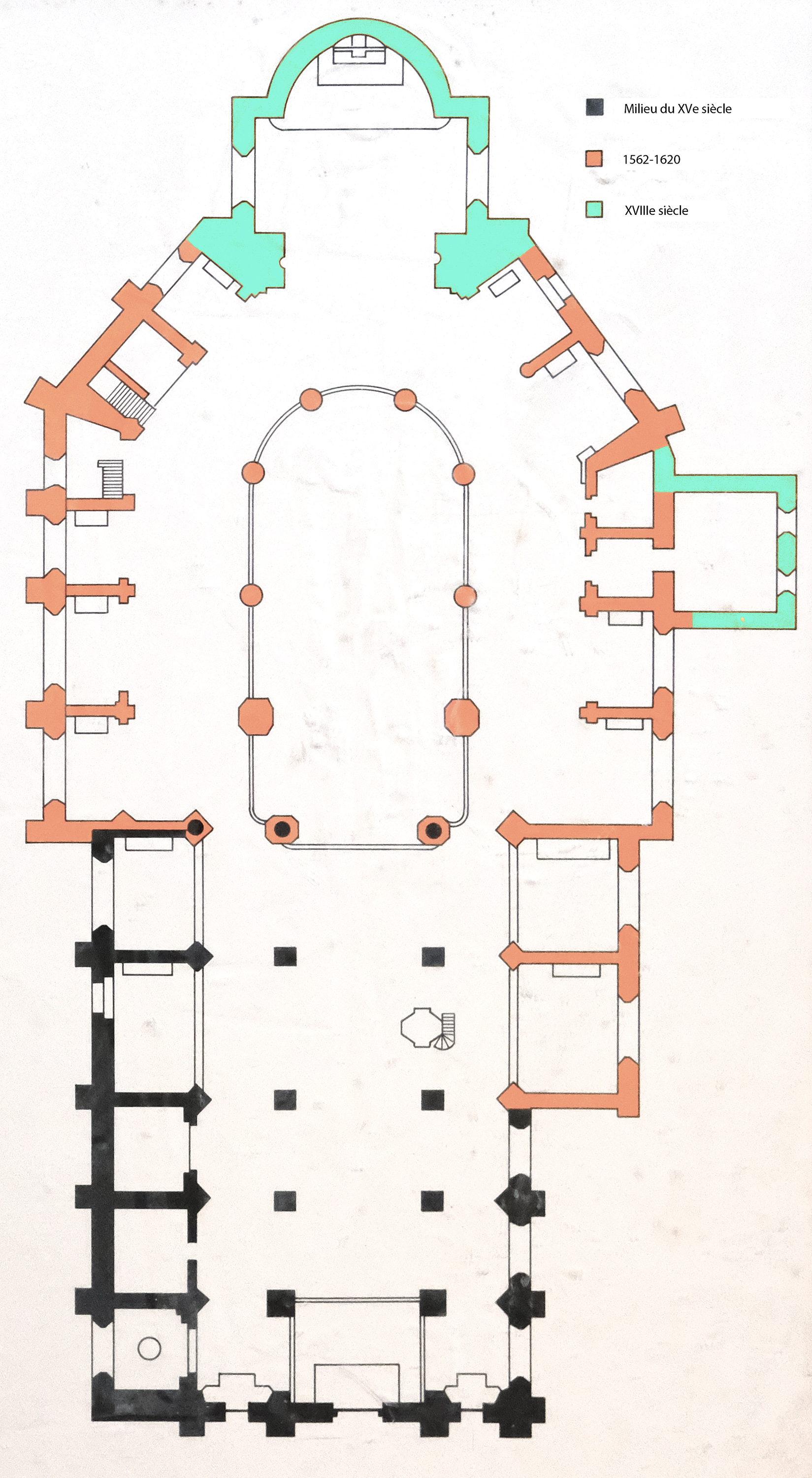
Plan of the church, showing the periods of construction

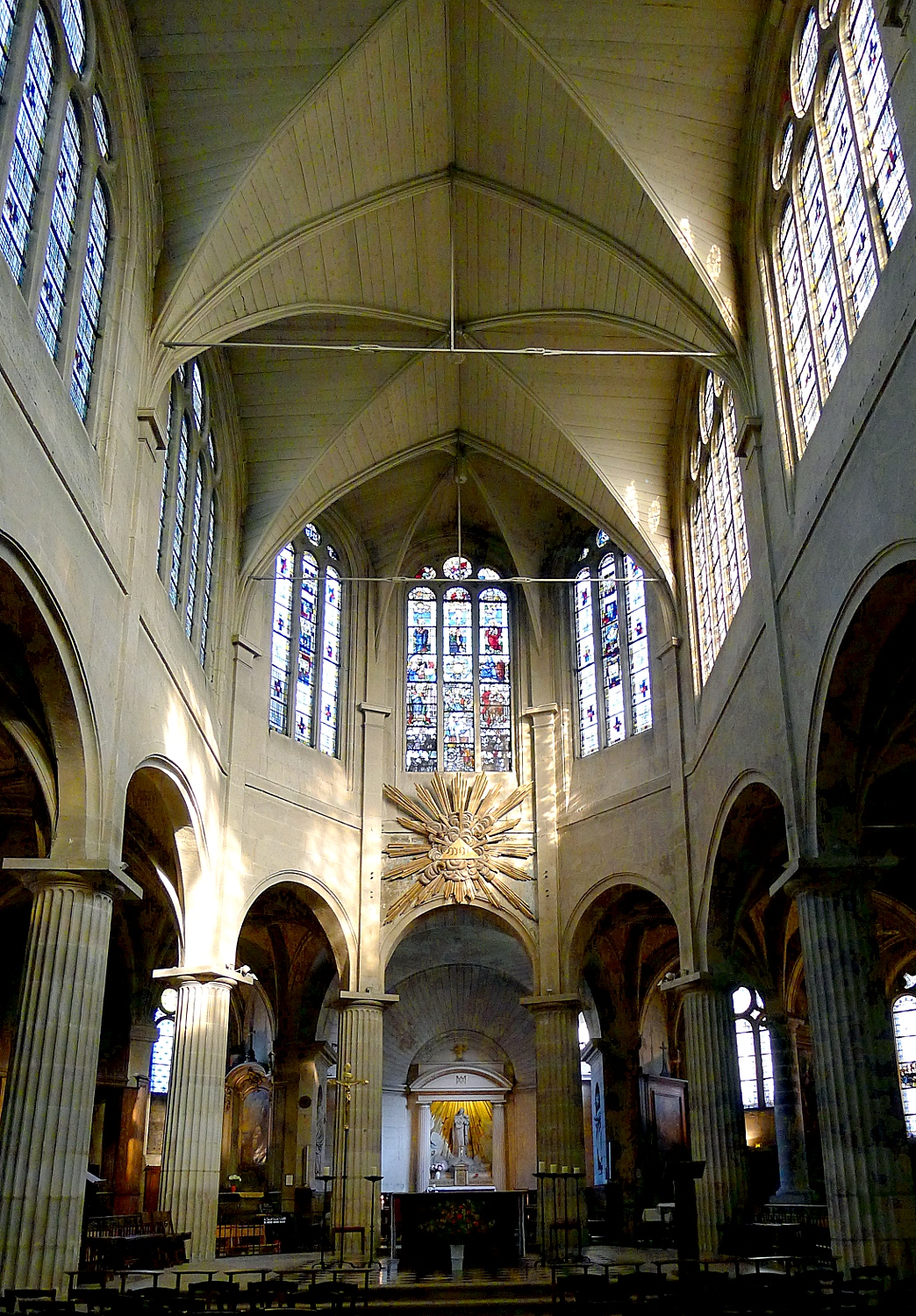
The choir, with its wooden vaults

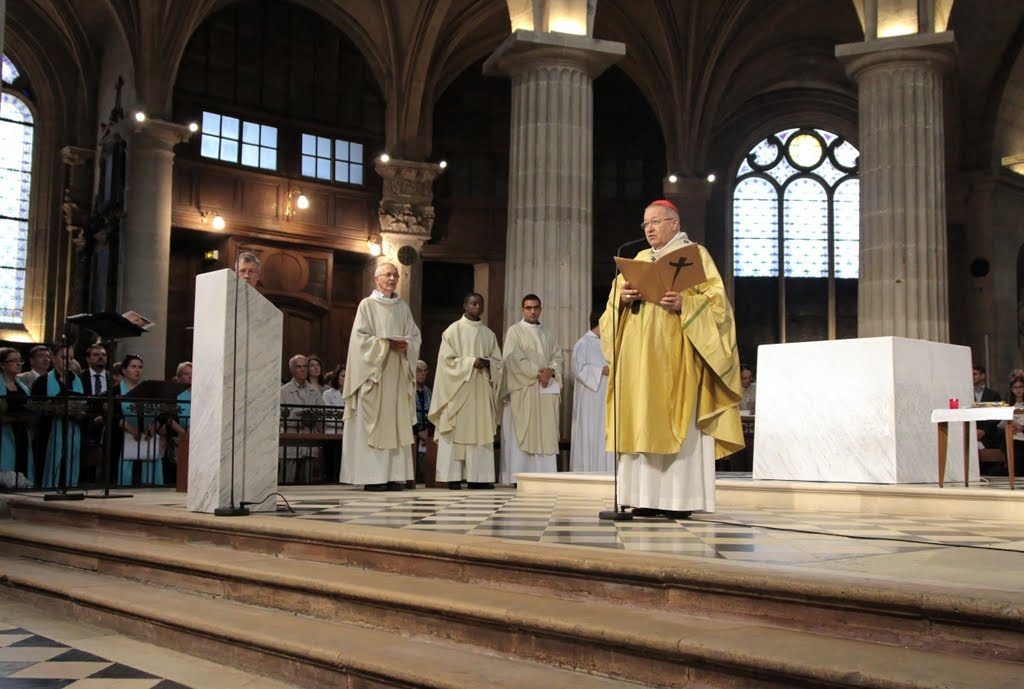
Dedication of new altar by André Vingt-Trois, Archbishop of Paris (September 11, 2011)

=== The nave, and the choir ===
The periods of construction are visible in the different styles in the nave. The first three traverses of the nave date to the mid-15th to the early-16th century. are in the Flamboyant or late Gothic style. mid-15th to the early-16th century. The arcades have pointed arches, and are supported by columns without capitals. The next three traverses are from the 17th century, in a larger "tier-point" form. The choir, built between the mid-16th and the beginning of the 17th century, is in the Renaissance style, with rounded arches. In the 1622 the choir was given a new vaulted ceiling built of wood instead of stone. In the 18th century, the columns were carved with grooves to give them a more classical appearance. The carved wooden tower of the pulpit (1718) between the nave and choir is the classical centerpiece of the church.

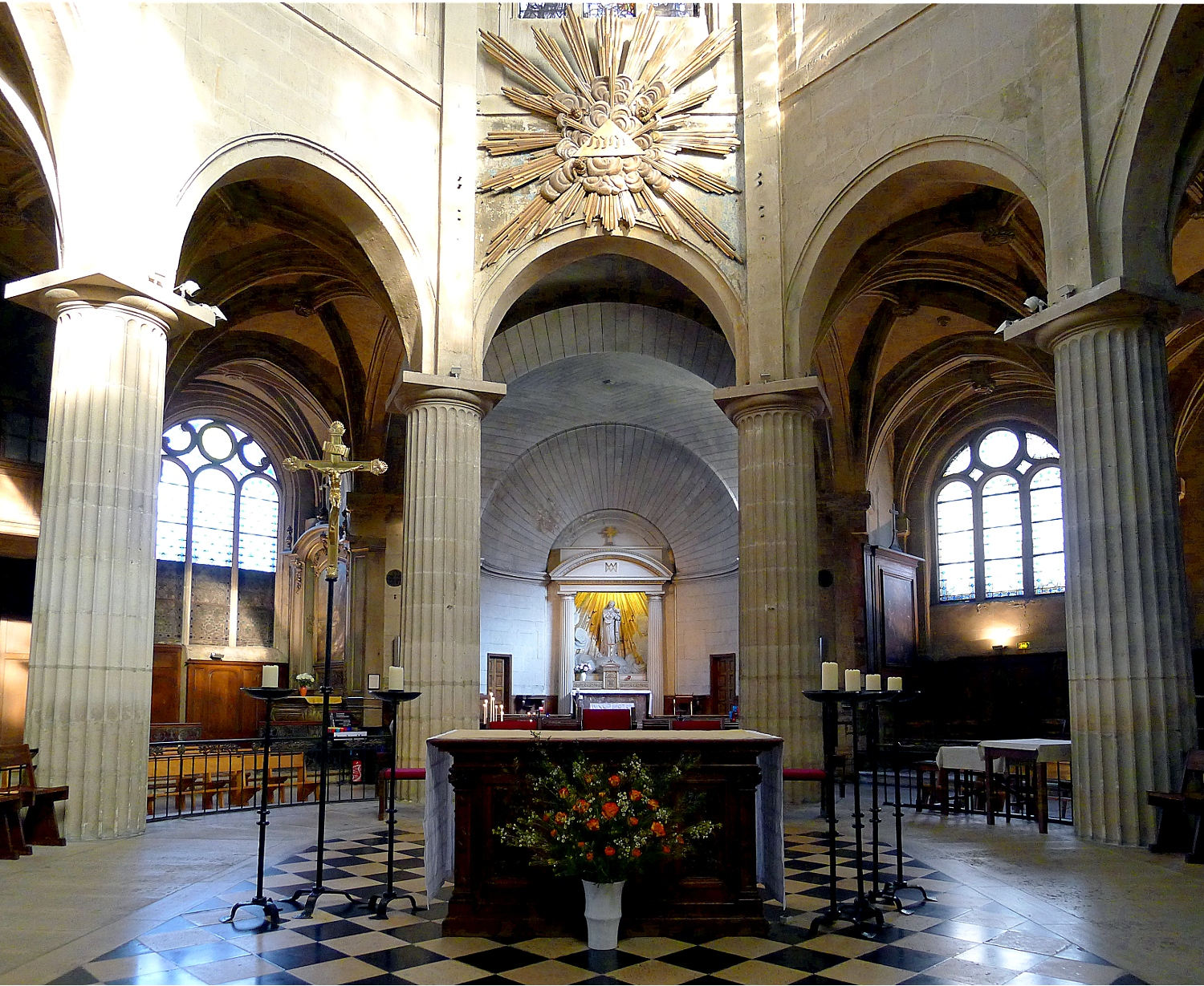
The classical choir and altar

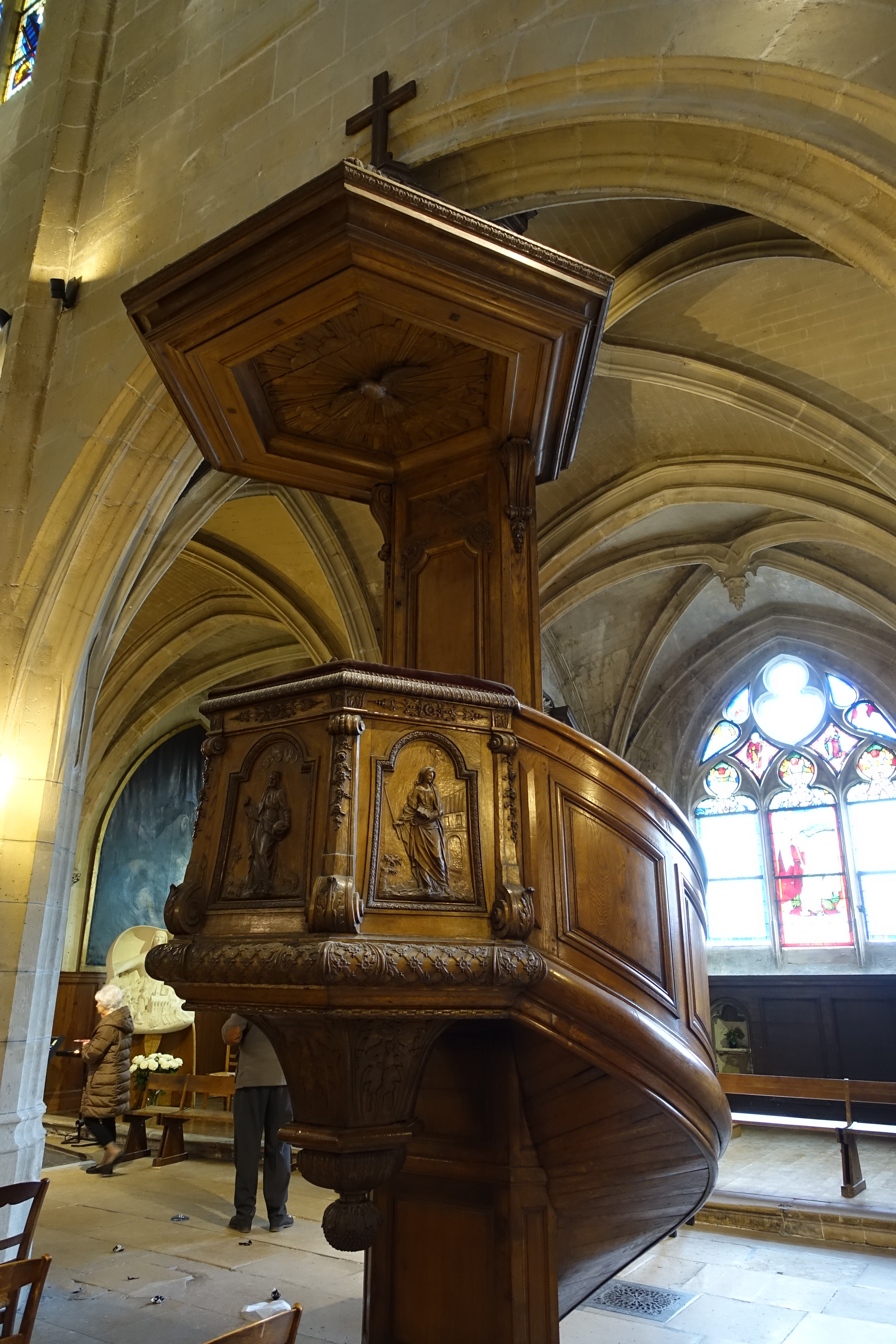
The pulpit (1718)

=== The disambulatory and chapels ===
The oldest chapels are located on the left side in the west end of the nave. The disambulatory around and behind the choir leads to a series of more recent chapels and the axial chapel at the east end, which was added in the 18th century. The chapels are filled with elaborate art work and decoration. The chapel at the east end of the church was constructed by the architect Louis-François Petit-Radel in 1784. In conformance with a vow made by King Louis XIII, this chapel, like other axial chapels in France of the period, were dedicated to the Virgin Mary. It has a classical simplicity. Until recent times, the chapel was closed off from view of the rest of the church by a wall of stone rubble.

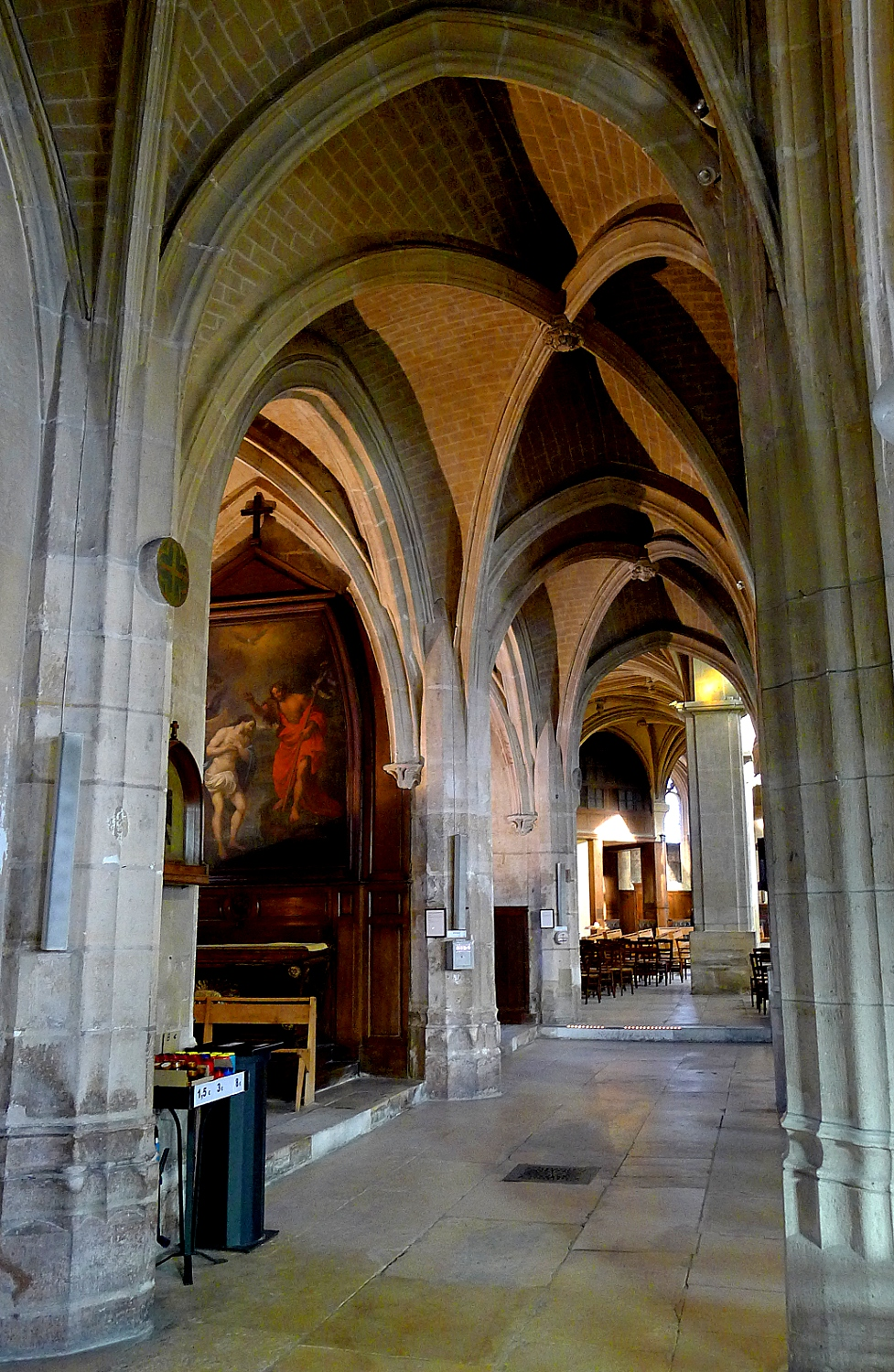
Chapels on the north side of the nave

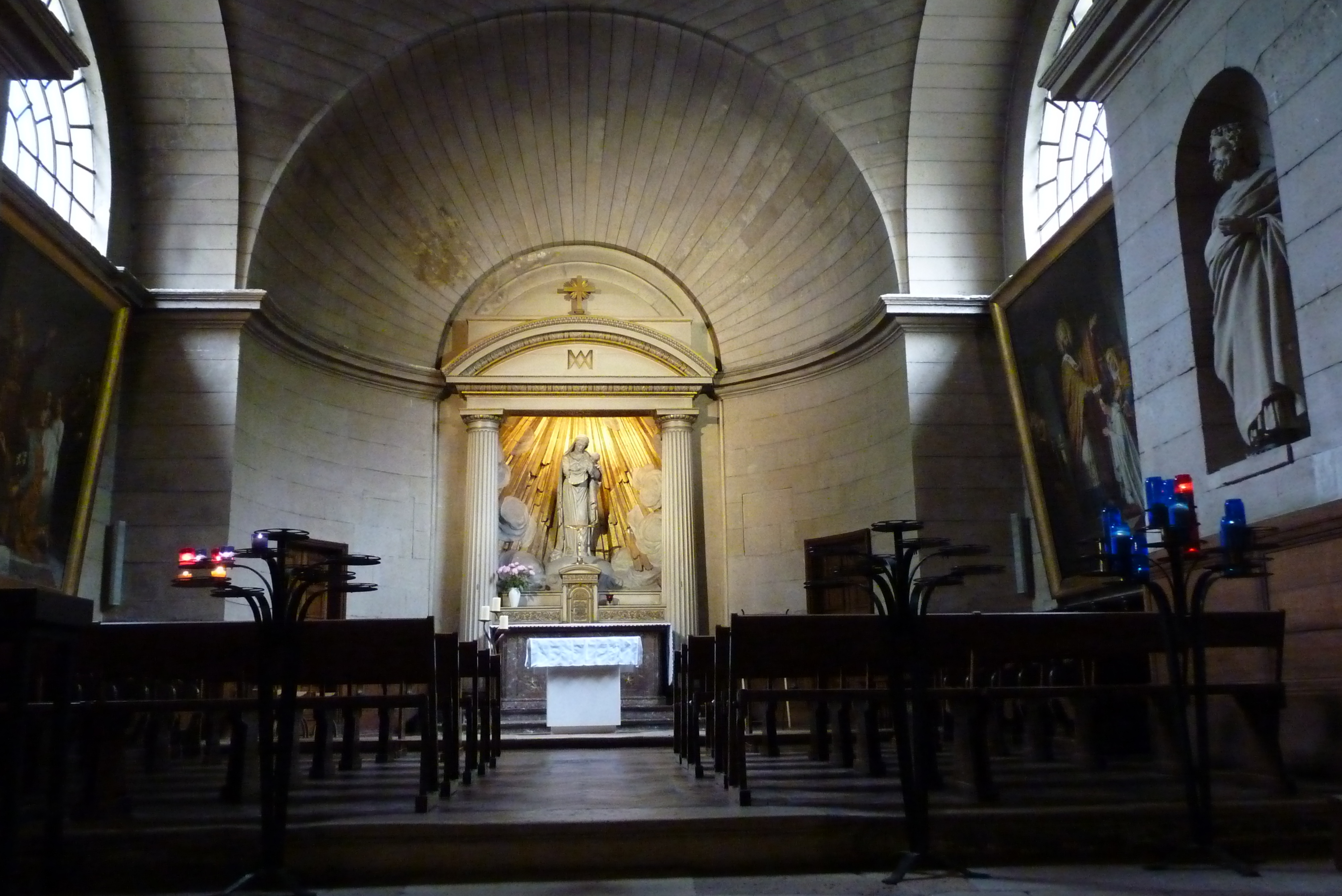
Chapel of the Virgin, at east end of church

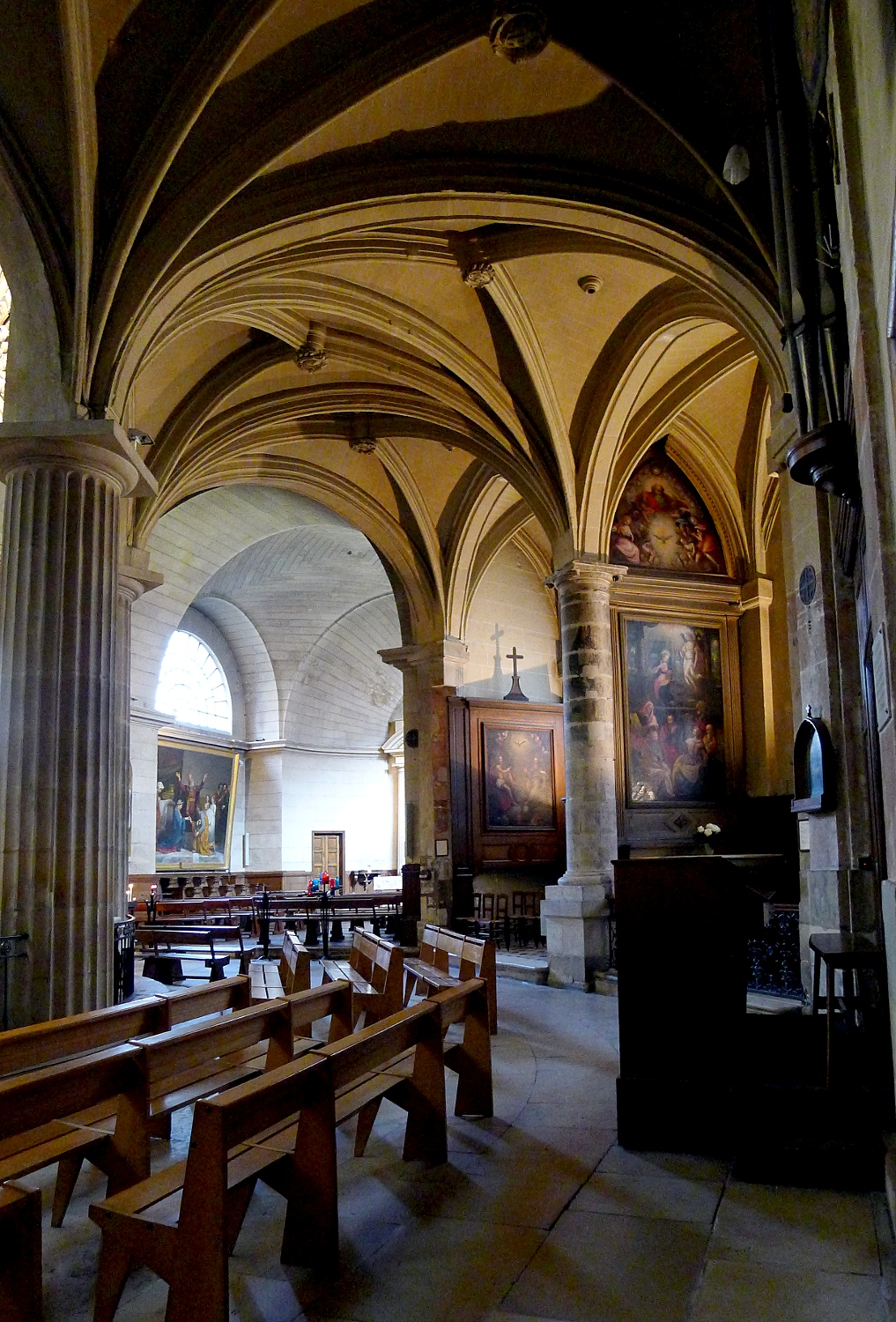
Chapels of the disambulatory

== Art and Decoration ==
=== Sculpture ===
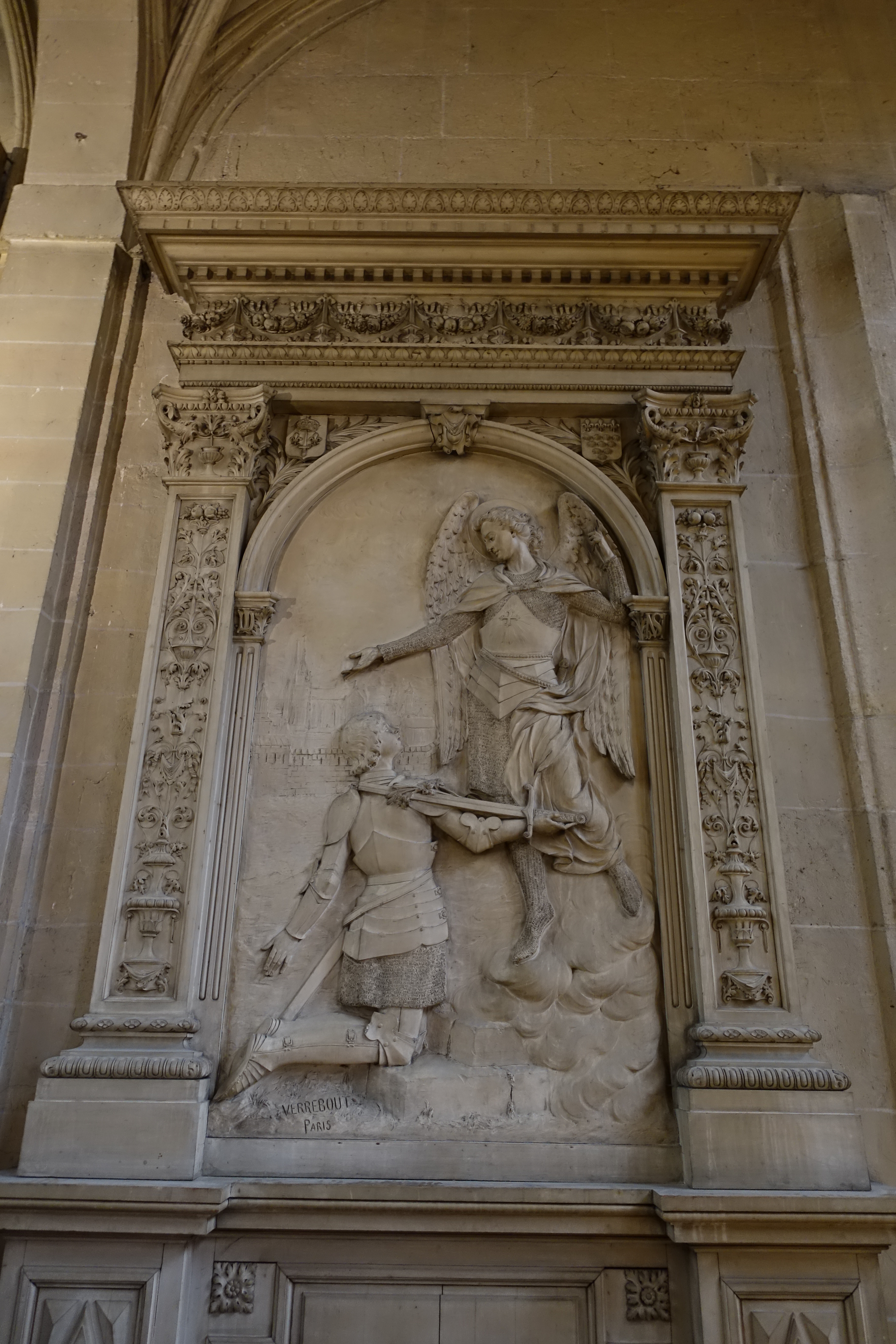
Archangel appearing to Saint Joan of Arc by Verrebout (1888-1889).

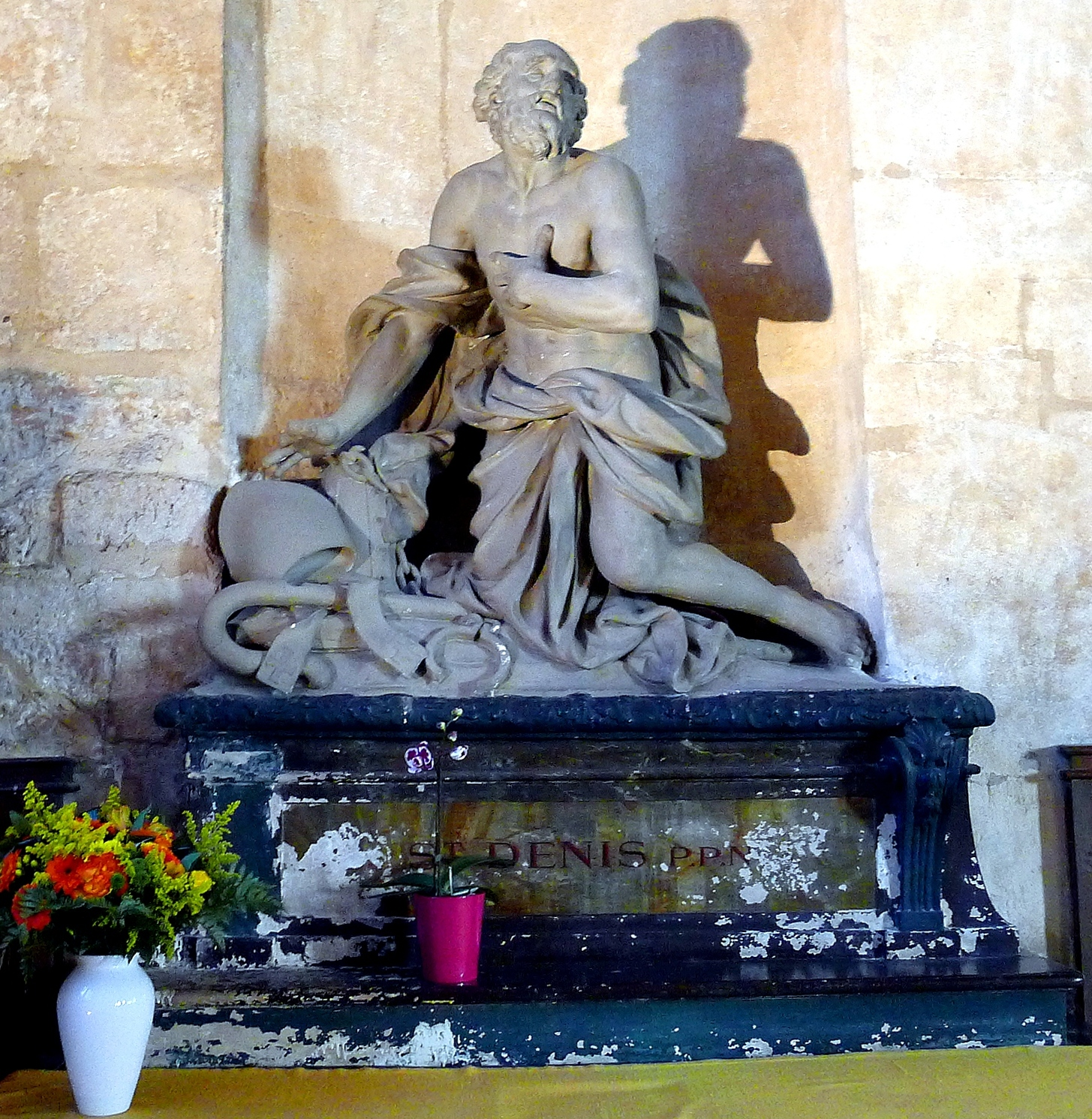
Saint Denis penitent (18th c.)

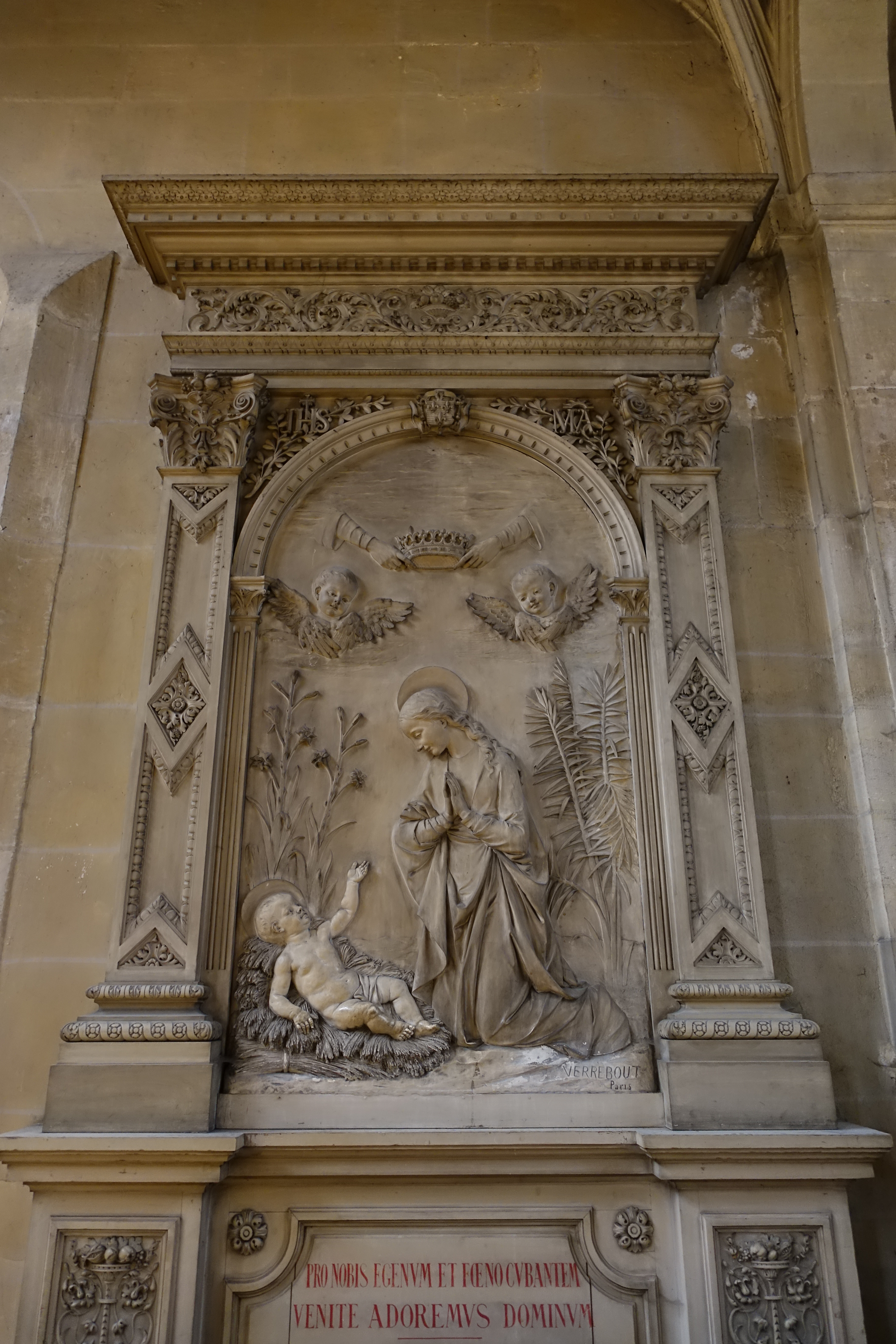
Bas-relief of La Vierge et l'Enfan, by Verrebout (1888-1889)

=== Column sculpture ===
Several vestiges of sculpture from the earlier churches can be seen in the column capitals and in places where the arches meet the walls of the nave.

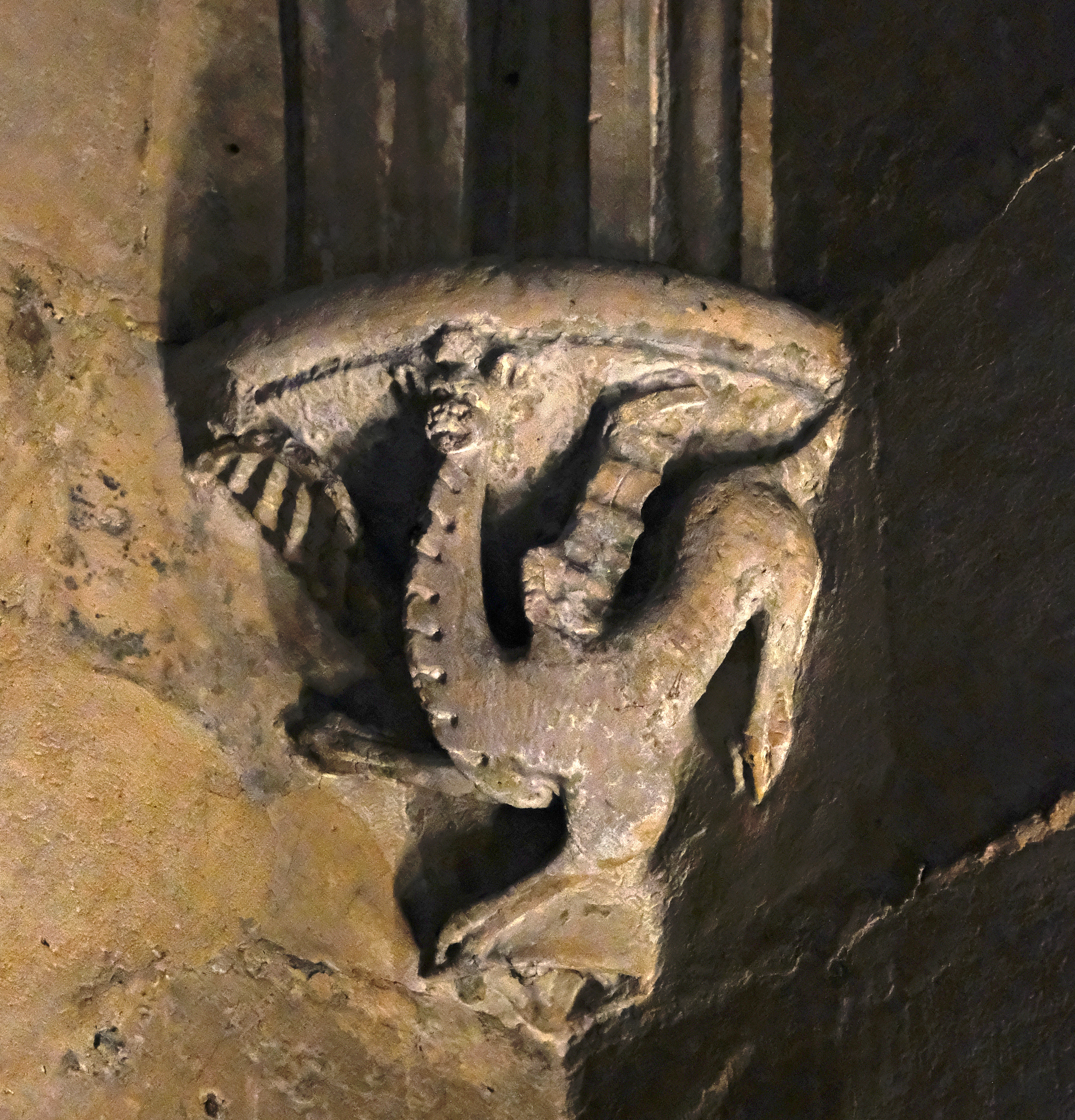
Gothic arch sculpture - a Harpy, half-woman, half bird (15th century)

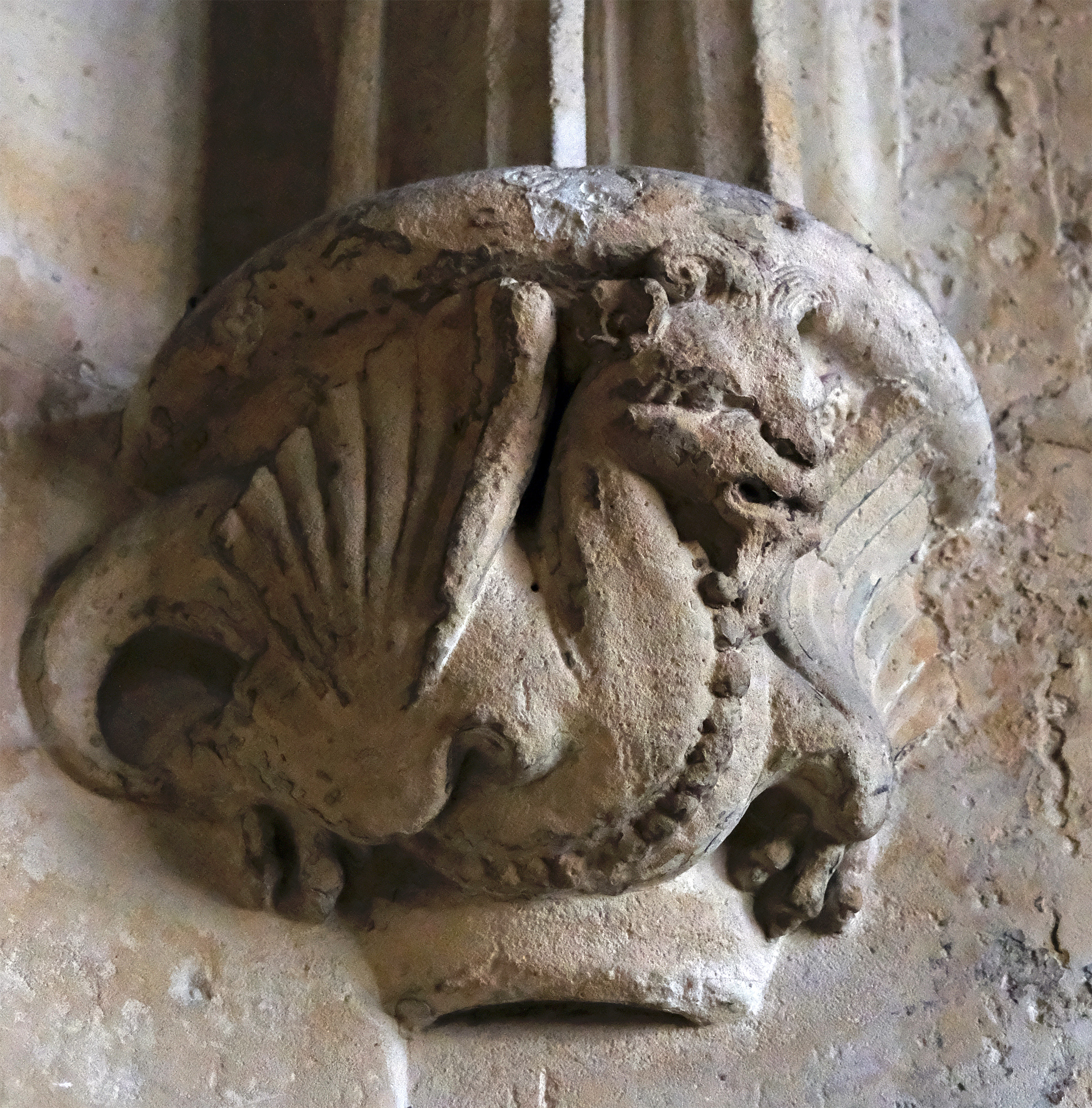
Gothic arch - a dragon (15th century

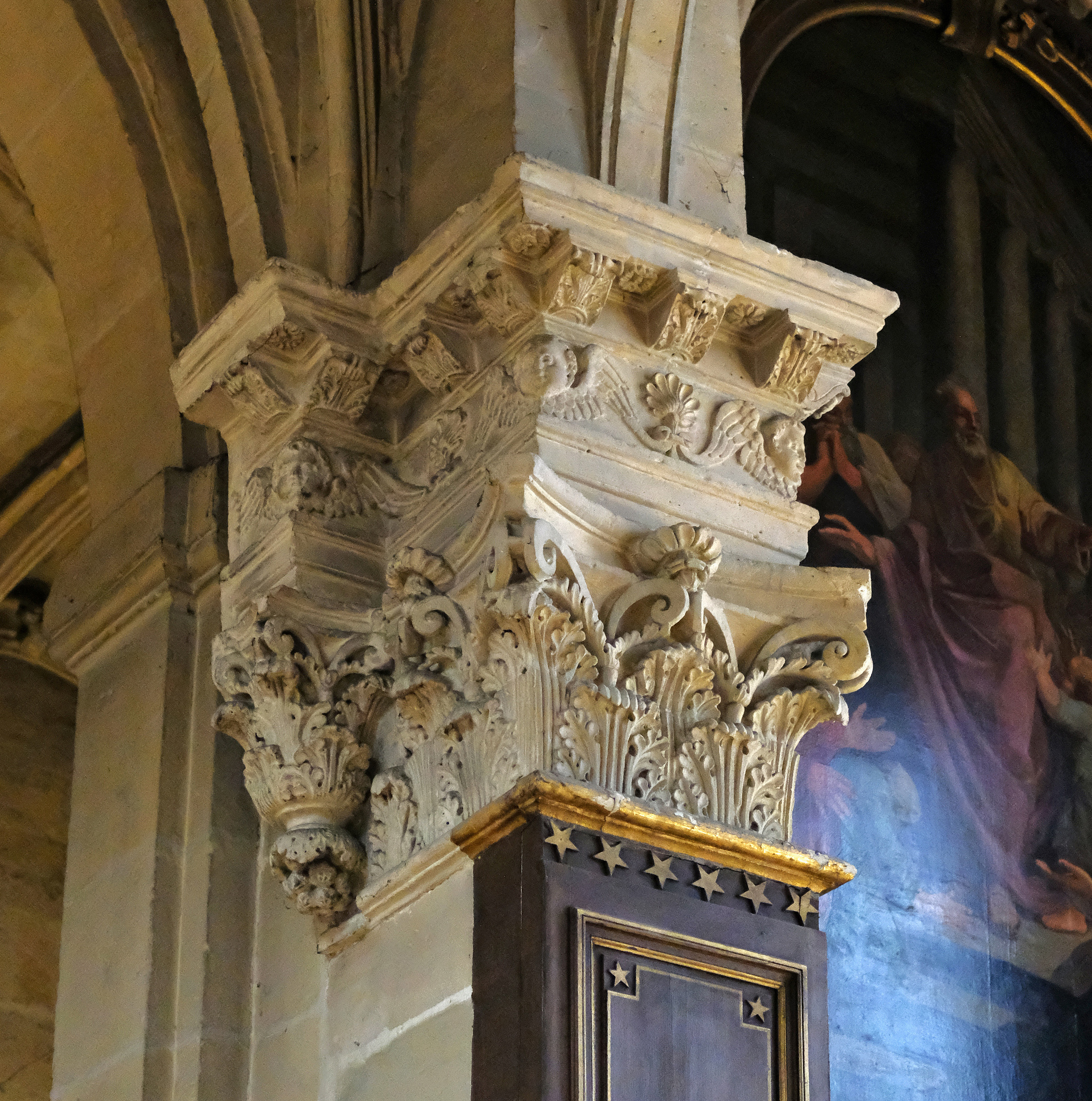
Classical column capital in choir

=== Paintings ===
The chapels along the sides of the church contain several paintings by notable artists of the 18th and 19th centuries. They include:

- "Jesus chasing the merchants from the Temple" by Charles-Joseph Natoire (1700–1777)
- "The promenade of Saint Joseph and the Infant Jesus" by Francisco de Zurbarán
- "Saint Cecila" by Pierre-Jacques Cazes (1676–1754)
- "The Marriage of the Virgin" by Alexandre-François Caminade (1783–1852)

The work by Zurbaran was originally painted for the altarpiece in a convent in Seville, then was sold to a French banker who placed it in the church. The painting of Caminade of "The Marriage of the Virgin" was commission by Cardinal Melchior de Polignac when Caminade was still a student in the Academy of Rome.

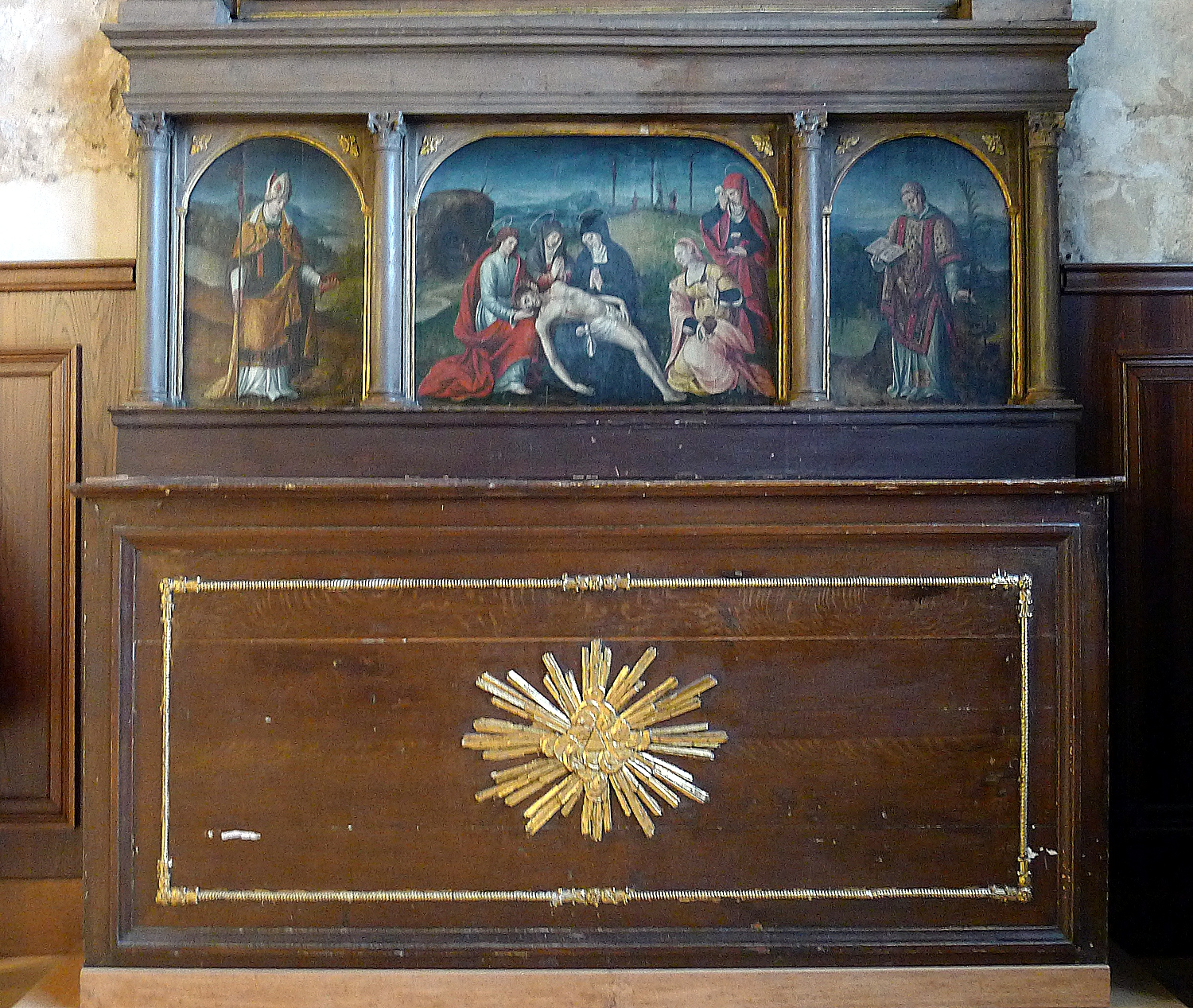
Retable in Chapel of Saint_Catherine, paintings of Christ and the Virgin Mary after the Crucifixion, Saint Vincent and Saint Honoré (anonymous artist, 16h century)

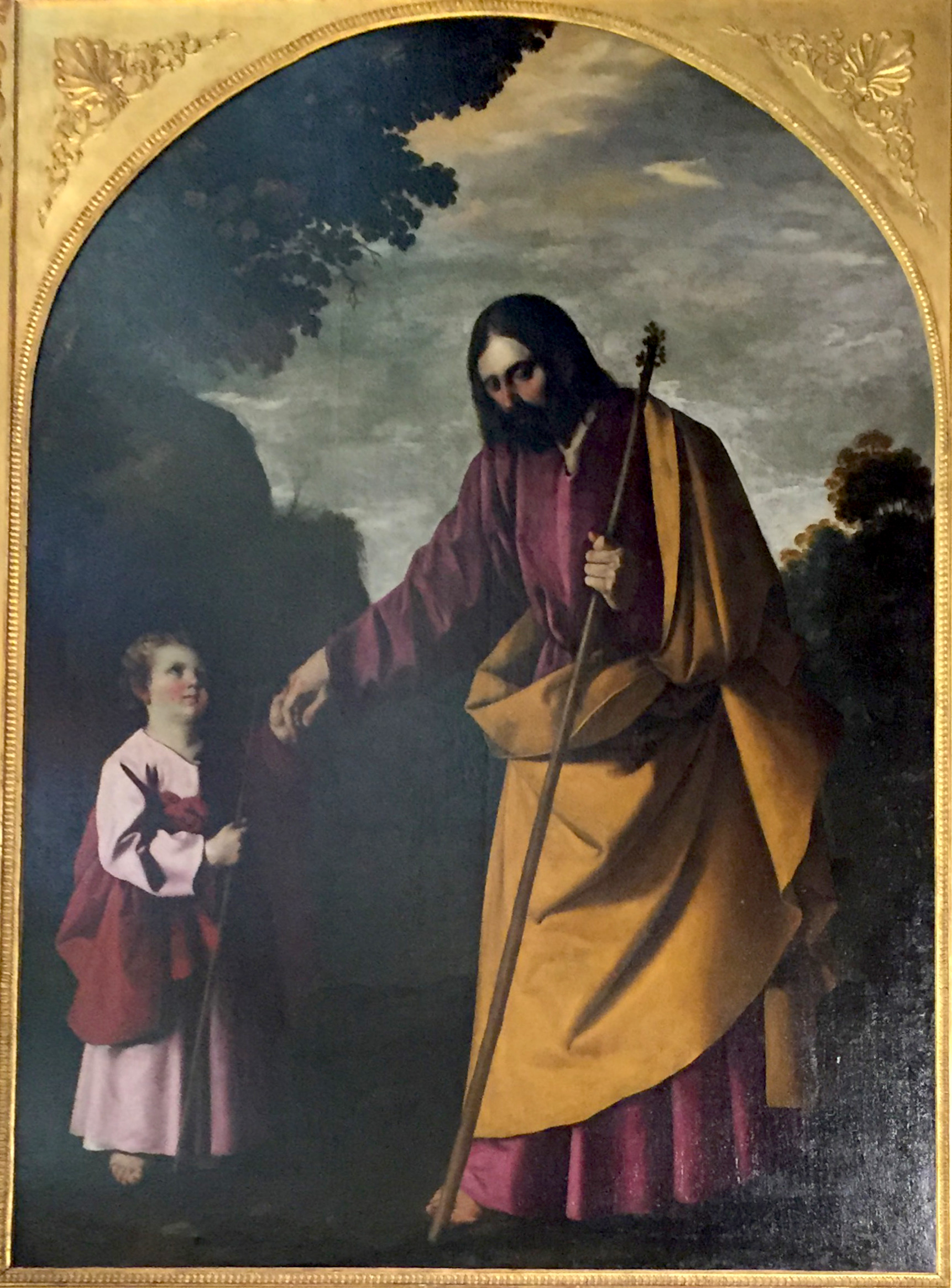
"Promenade of Saint Joseph with Infant Jesus" by Francisco de Zurbarán (1598 –1664)

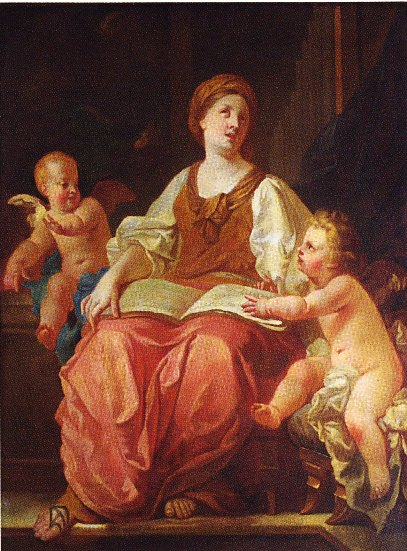
"Saint Cecila" by Pierre-Jacques Cazes (1676–1754)

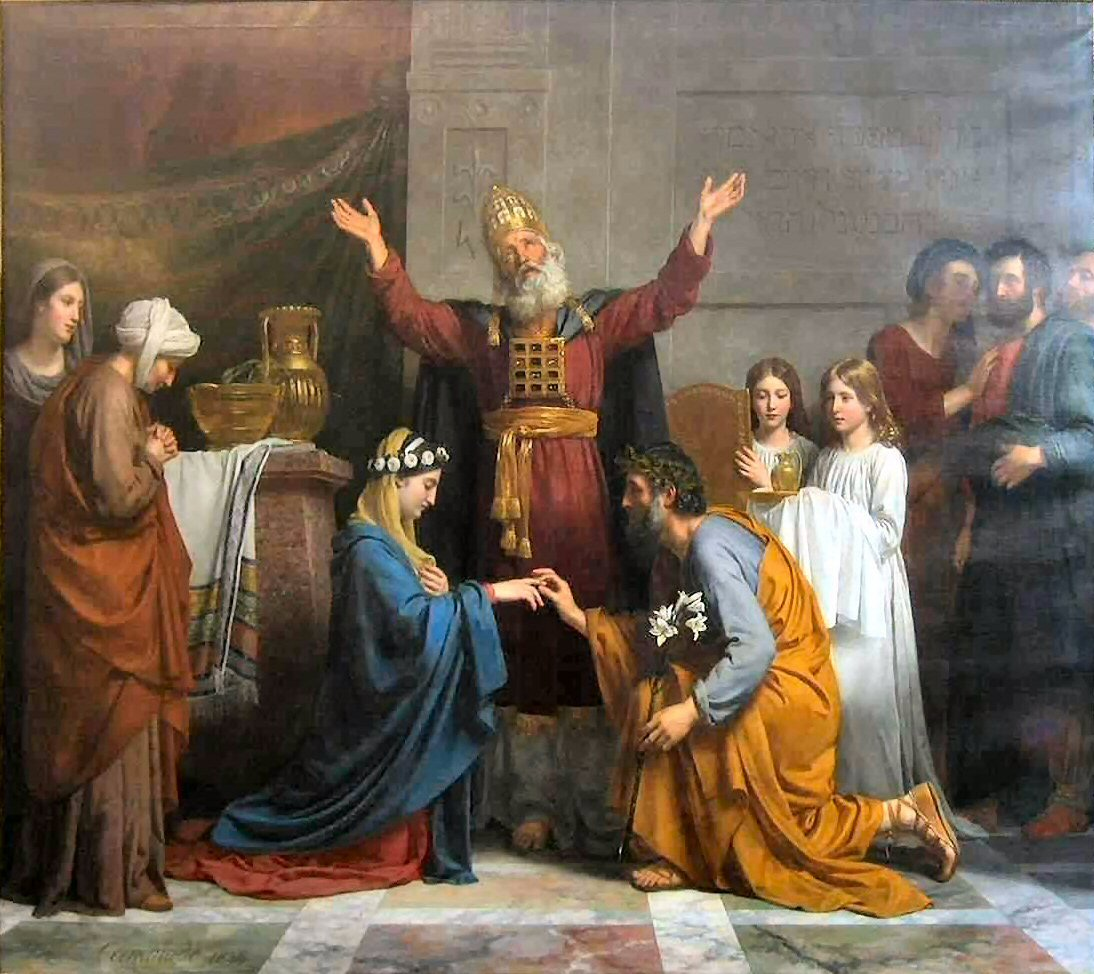
"The Marriage of the Virgin" by Alexandre-François Caminade (1783-1852)

=== Stained glass ===
In the chapels the church has preserved a number of old panels of stained glass from the 16th century, which have been inserted into newer windows.

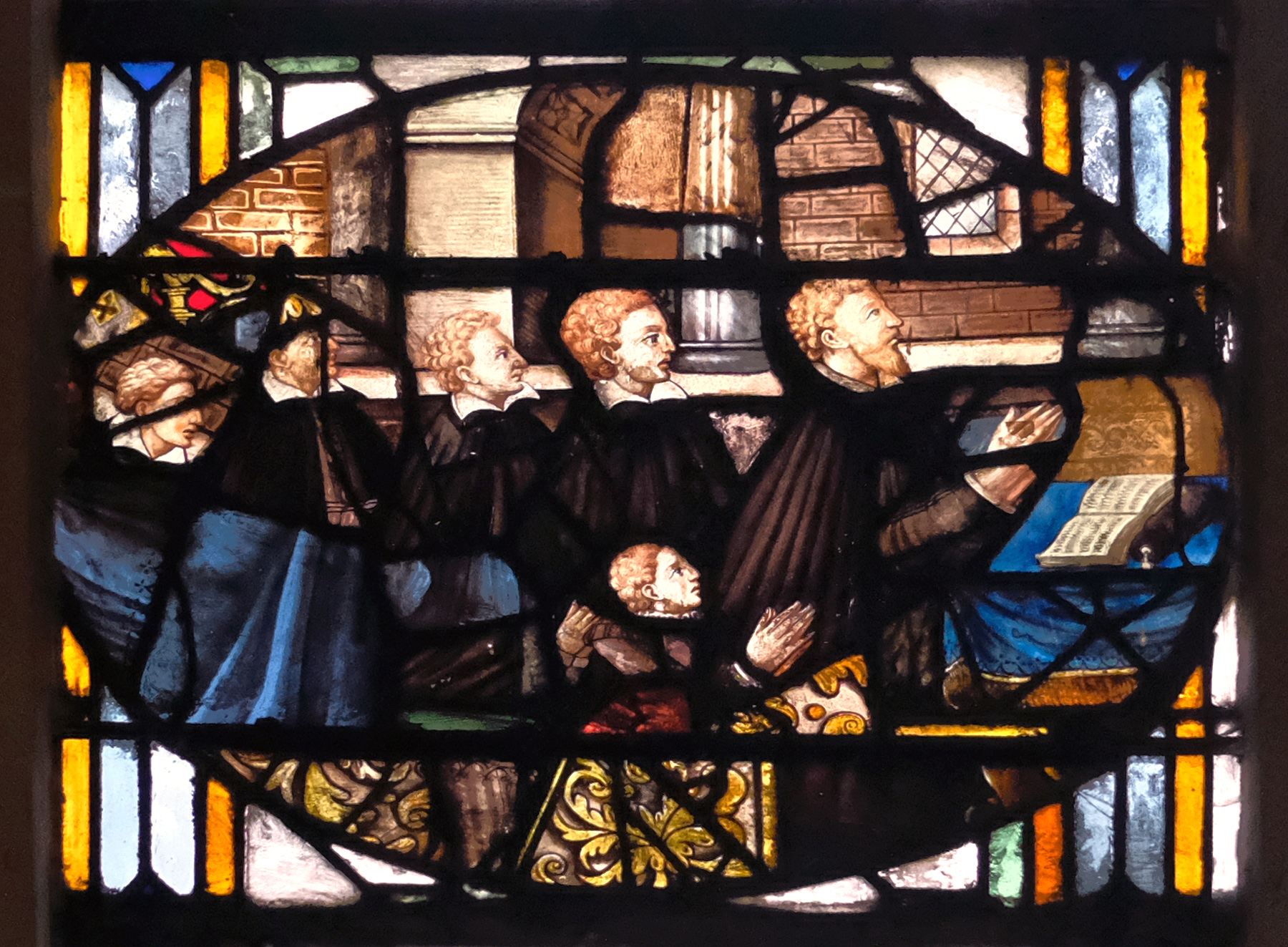
"Donors in Prayer", Chapel of the Annunciation (16th century)

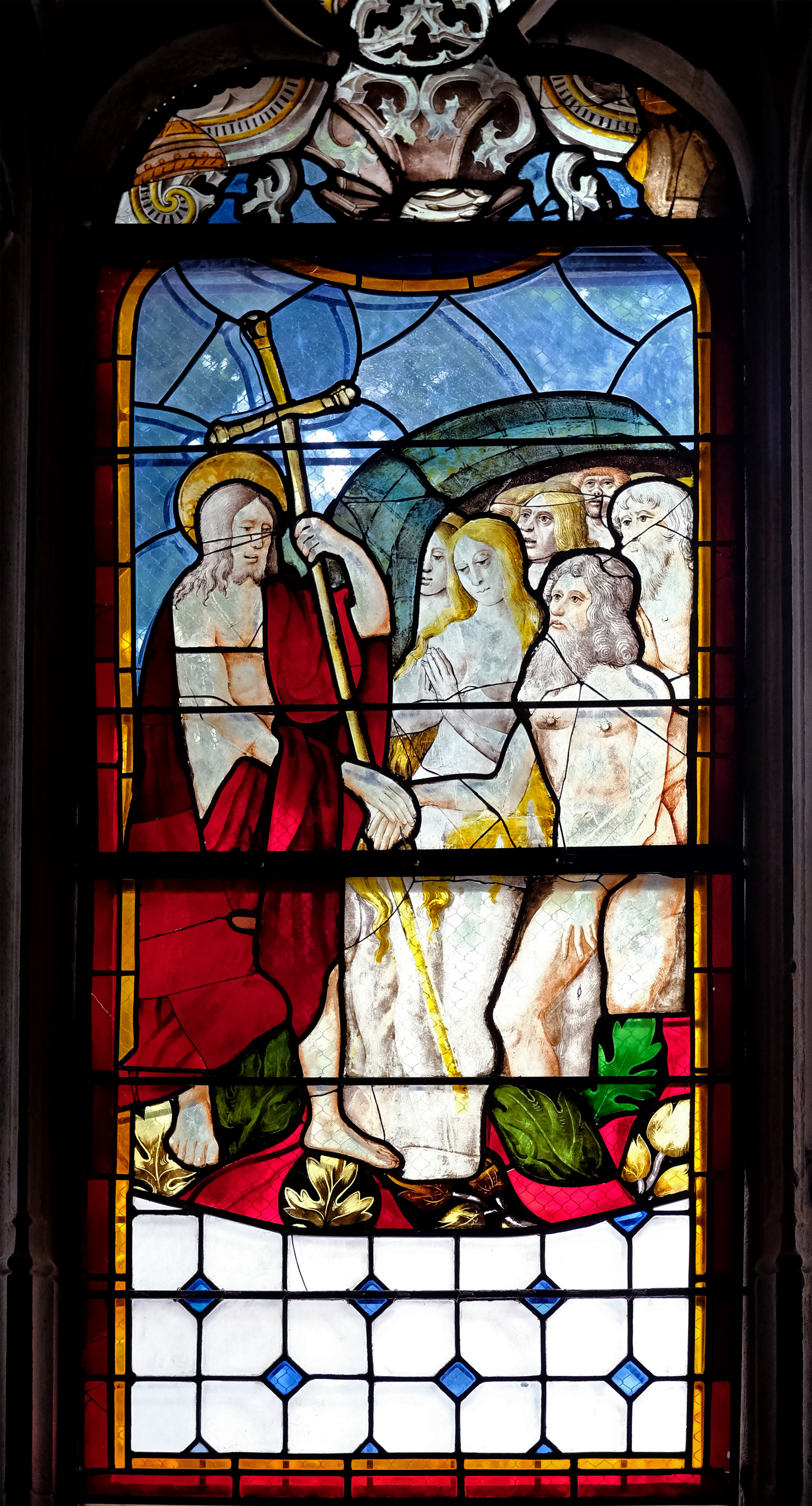
"Christ and St. Roch, St. Catherine (16th c.)

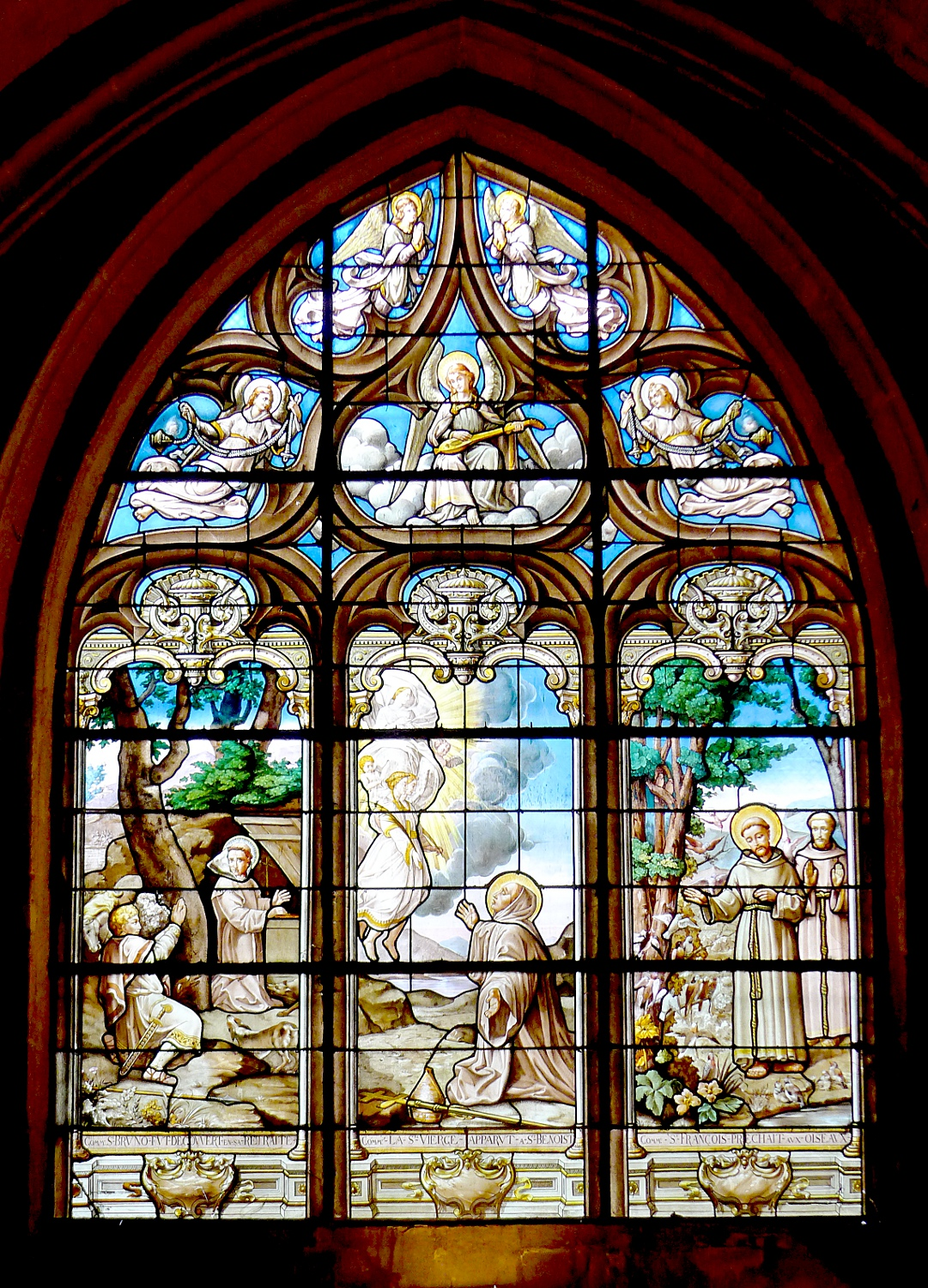
"Three Saints" (1889)

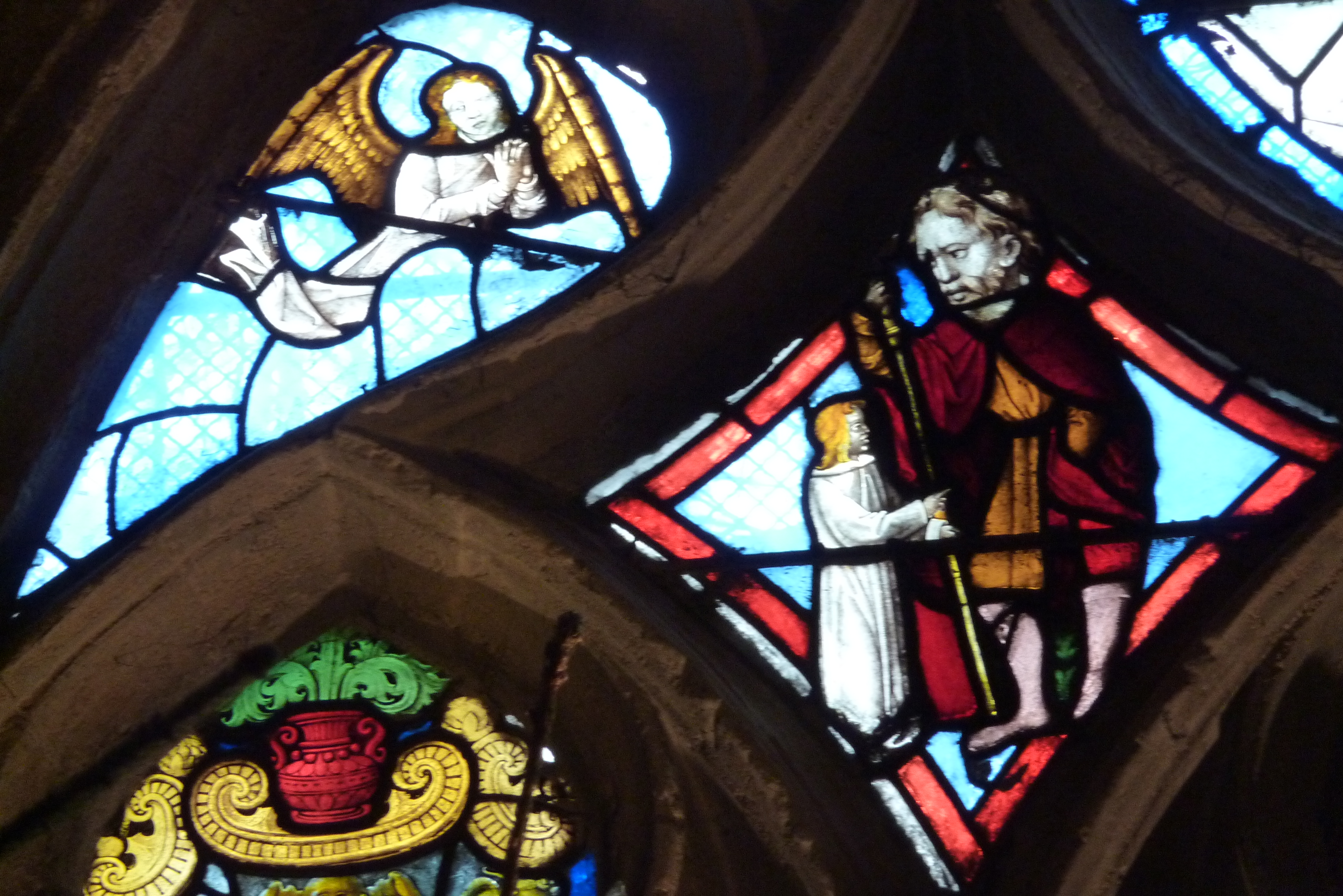
Angel and Saints (16th c.)
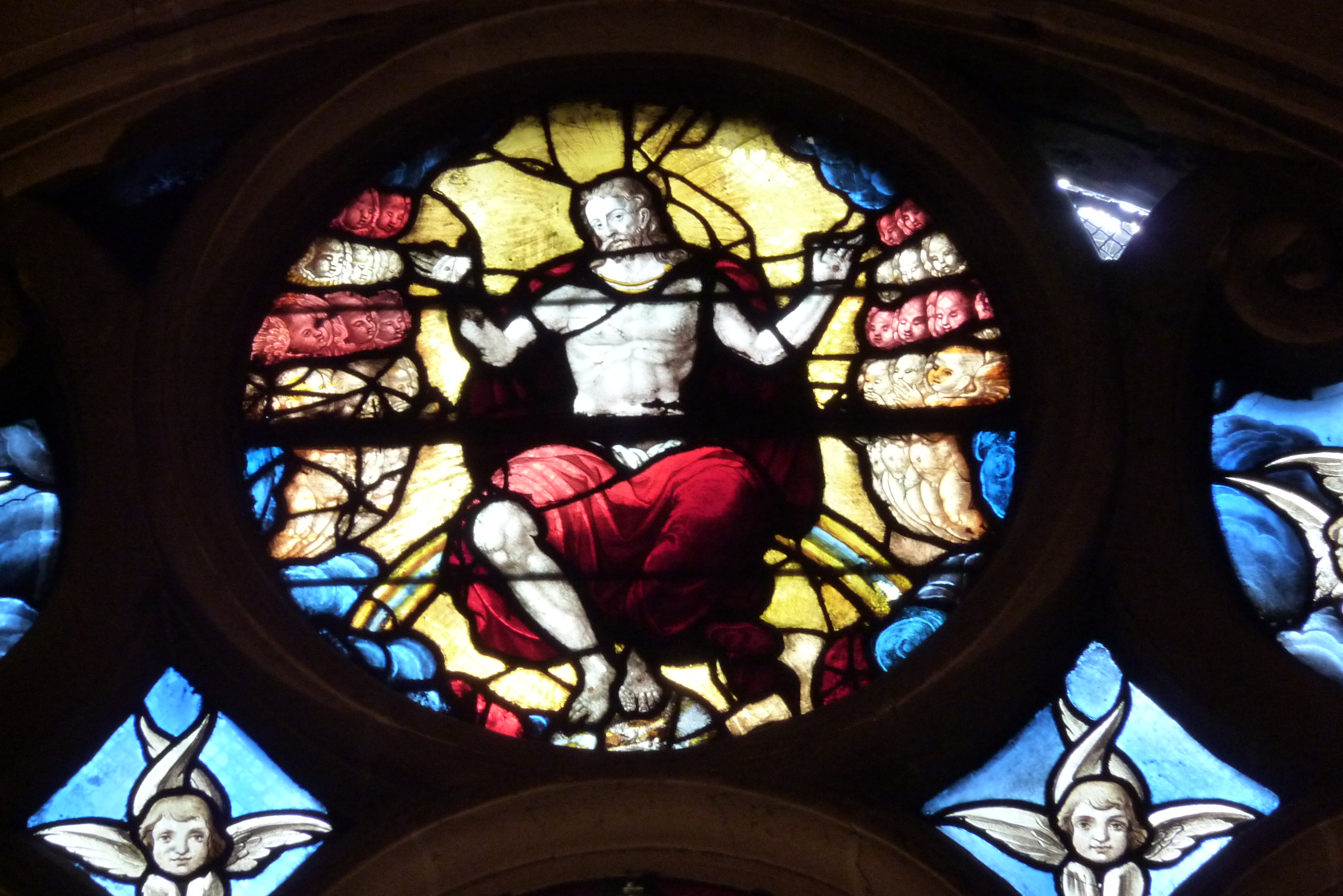
"Christ in Majesty"

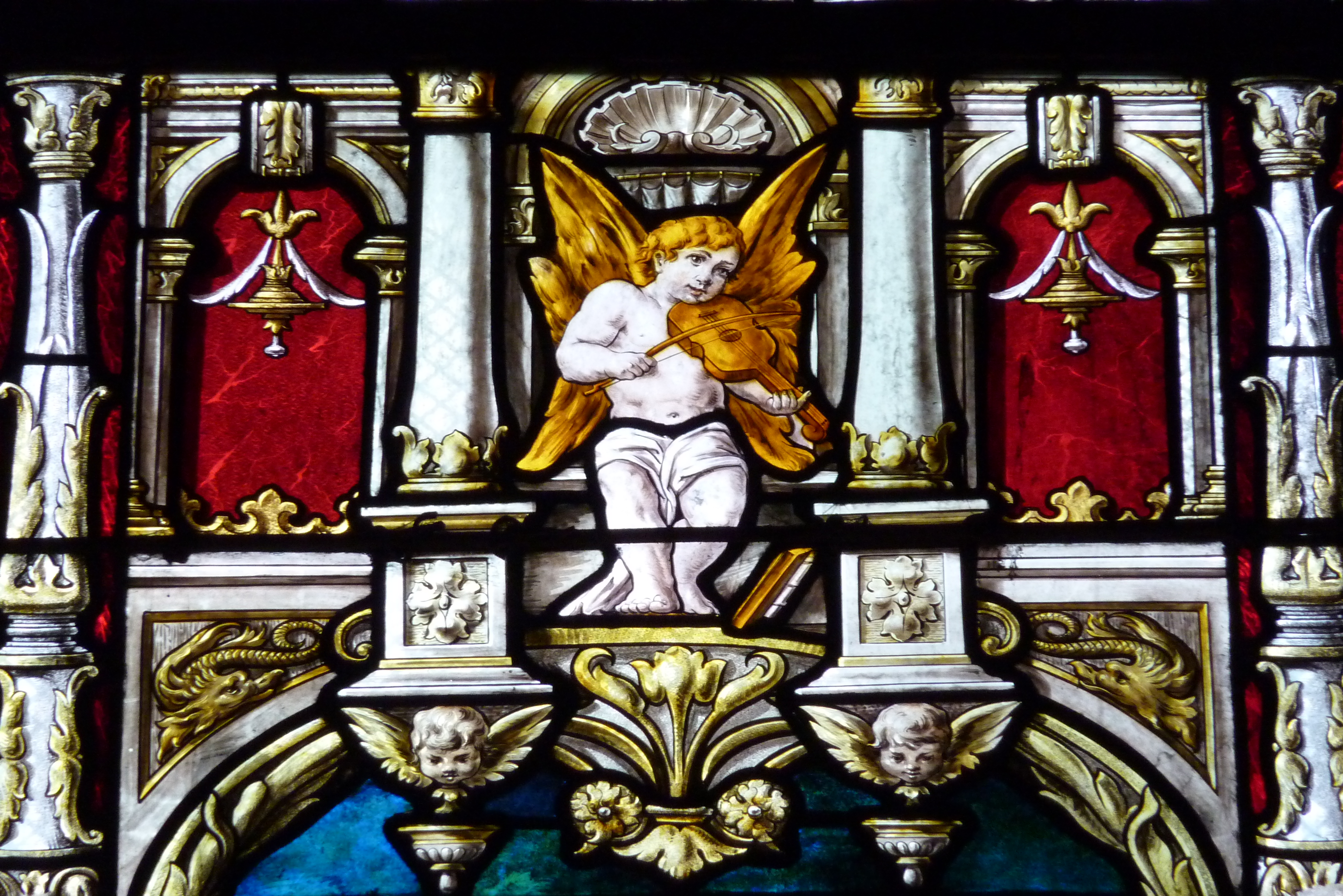
"Angel Musician"

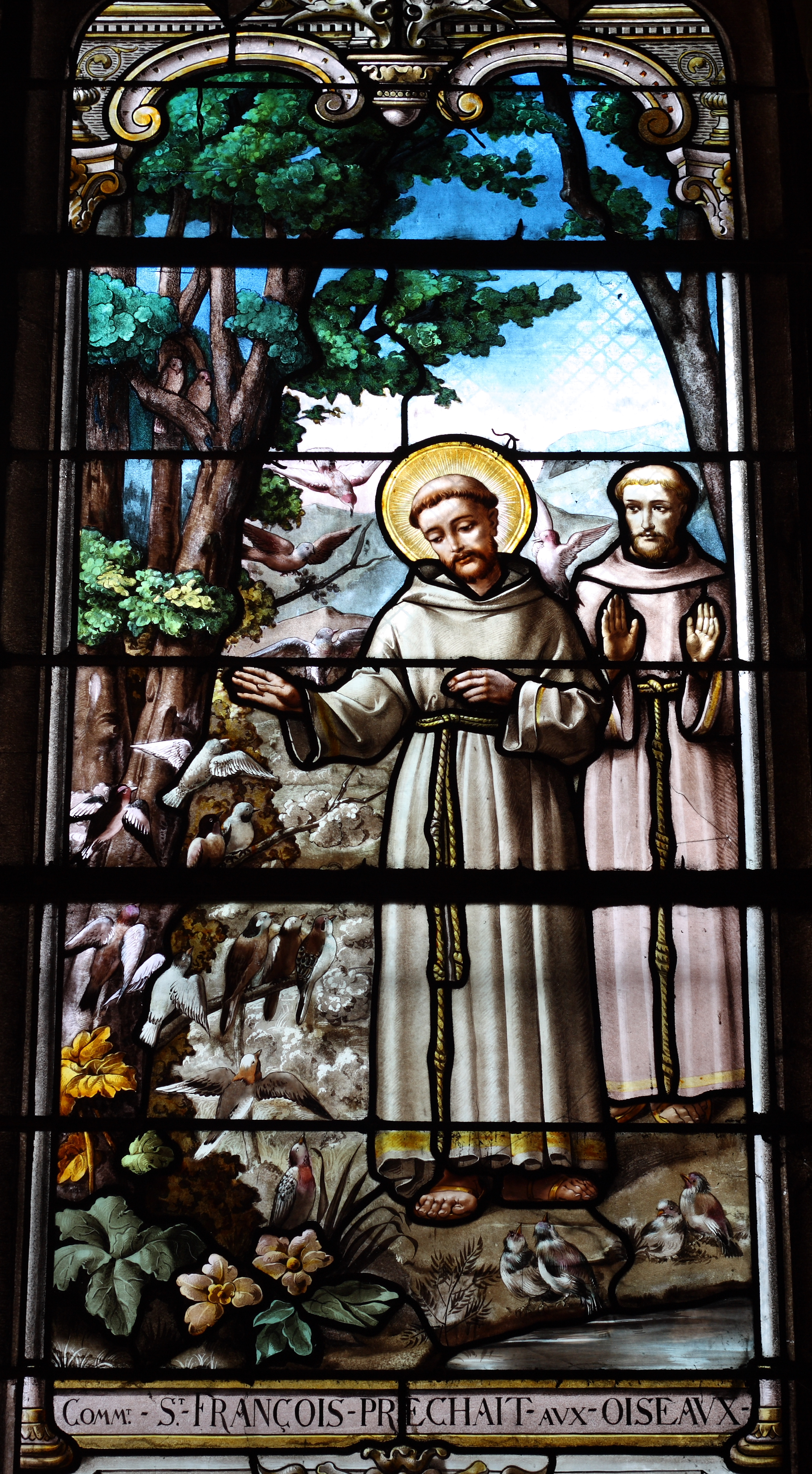
"Saint Francis of Assisi" (1889)

== The organ ==
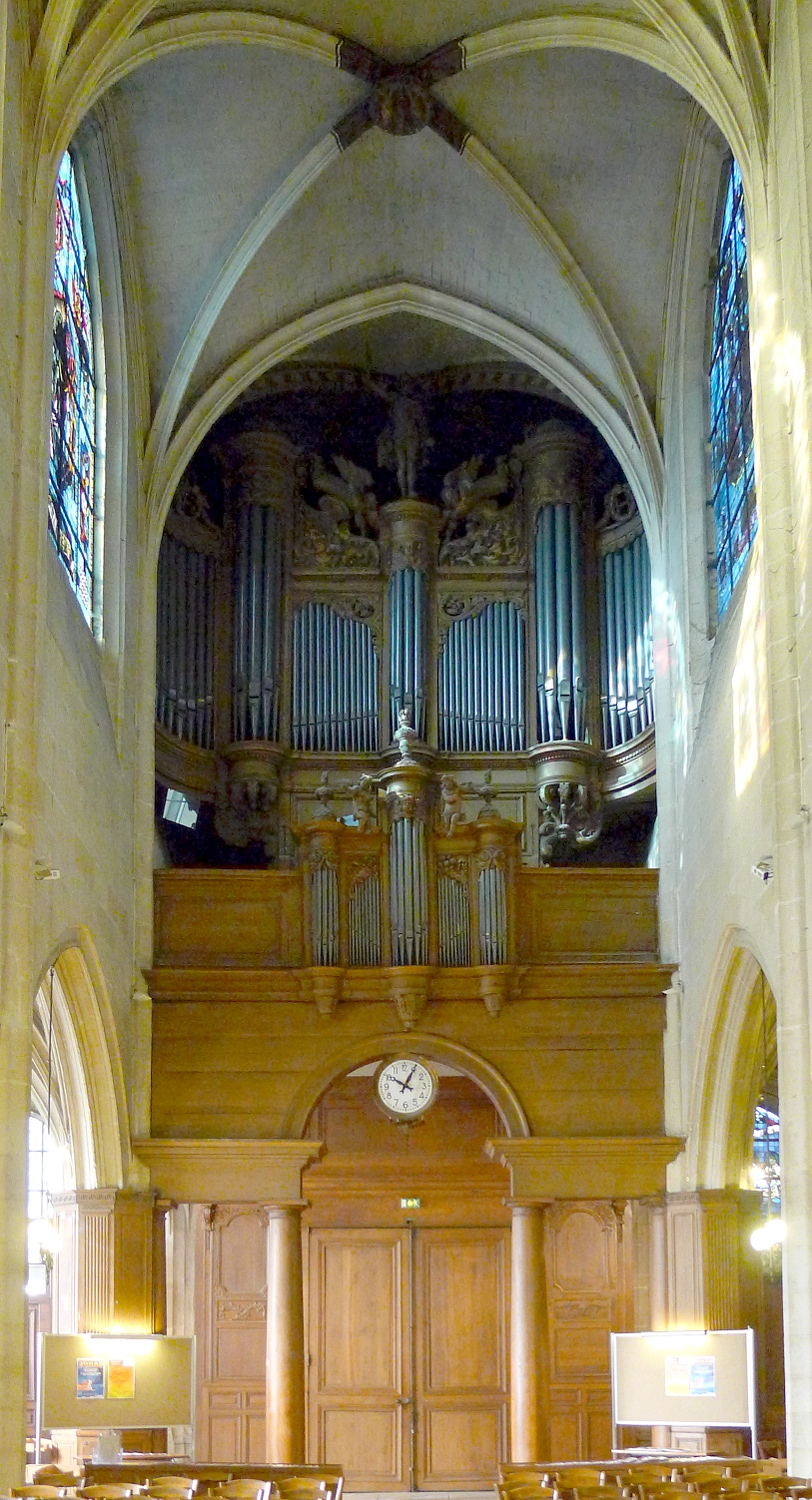
The organ on the tribune at the west end of the nave

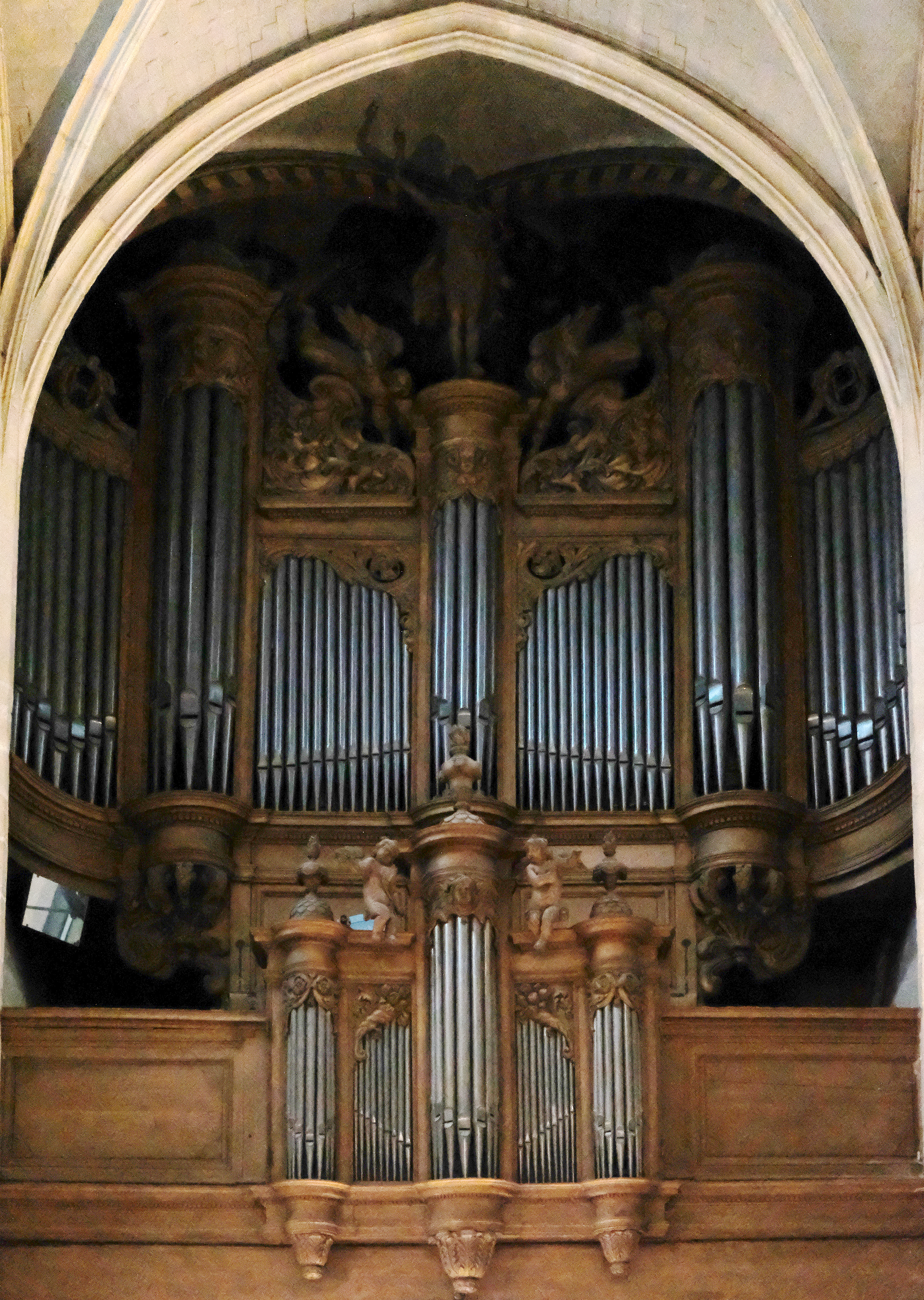
Detail of the organ case and decoration

The church organ, on the tribune over the west end of the church, was built by François-Henri Cliquot. The carved oak case of the organ was made in 1644–46 by the master wood artist Germain Pillon, and is one of the oldest in Paris. Its decoration features three towers topped with the heads of angels and harpies. At the top is a figure of Christ resurrected with two angels at his feet. The console of the organ is decorated with two angel- musicians.

== See also ==
- List of historic churches in Paris
- Convulsionnaires of Saint-Médard

== Bibliography ==
- Dumoulin, Aline; Ardisson, Alexandra; Maingard, Jérôme; Antonello, Murielle; Églises de Paris (2010), Éditions Massin, Issy-Les-Moulineaux, ISBN 978-2-7072-0683-1
- Lecompte, Francis and Ladoux, Bernard, "Paris Rive Gauche – Quartier Latin, St, Germain des Prés, Montparnasse – Les Essentials du Patrimoine", Éditions Massin, Paris, ISBN 978-2-7072-0870-5
- Strayer, Brian E. (2008). Suffering Saints: Jansensists and Convulsionnaires in France, 1640–1799. Sussex Academic Press. ISBN 978-1-84519-245-7.

== External links (In French) ==
- Web site of the church and parish
- Base Mérimée listing of the church by the Ministry of Culture
- Site of patrimoine-histoire.fr -Detailed description of the art and architecture
