= Alexandre-François Caminade =

French painter

Alexandre-François Caminade (14 December 1783 – May 1862) was a French painter. Caminade was born and died in Paris. He was a portraitist and a religious painter. He was Jacques-Louis David's pupil.

== Main works ==
- Flight into Egypt, St. Etienne du Mont, France
- Marriage of the Virgin, St. Etienne du Mont, France
- Adoration of the Magi, St. Etienne du Mont, France
- The Levite of Ephraim, Versailles
- Entry of the French into Antwerp, Versailles
- St. Theresa Receiving the Last Sacrament, Notre Dame de Lorette

=== Portraits ===
- Françoise-Marie de Bourbon, 1834
- Louise Anne de Bourbon, s. XIX, Mairie de Nozières y Château de Versailles

== Gallery ==
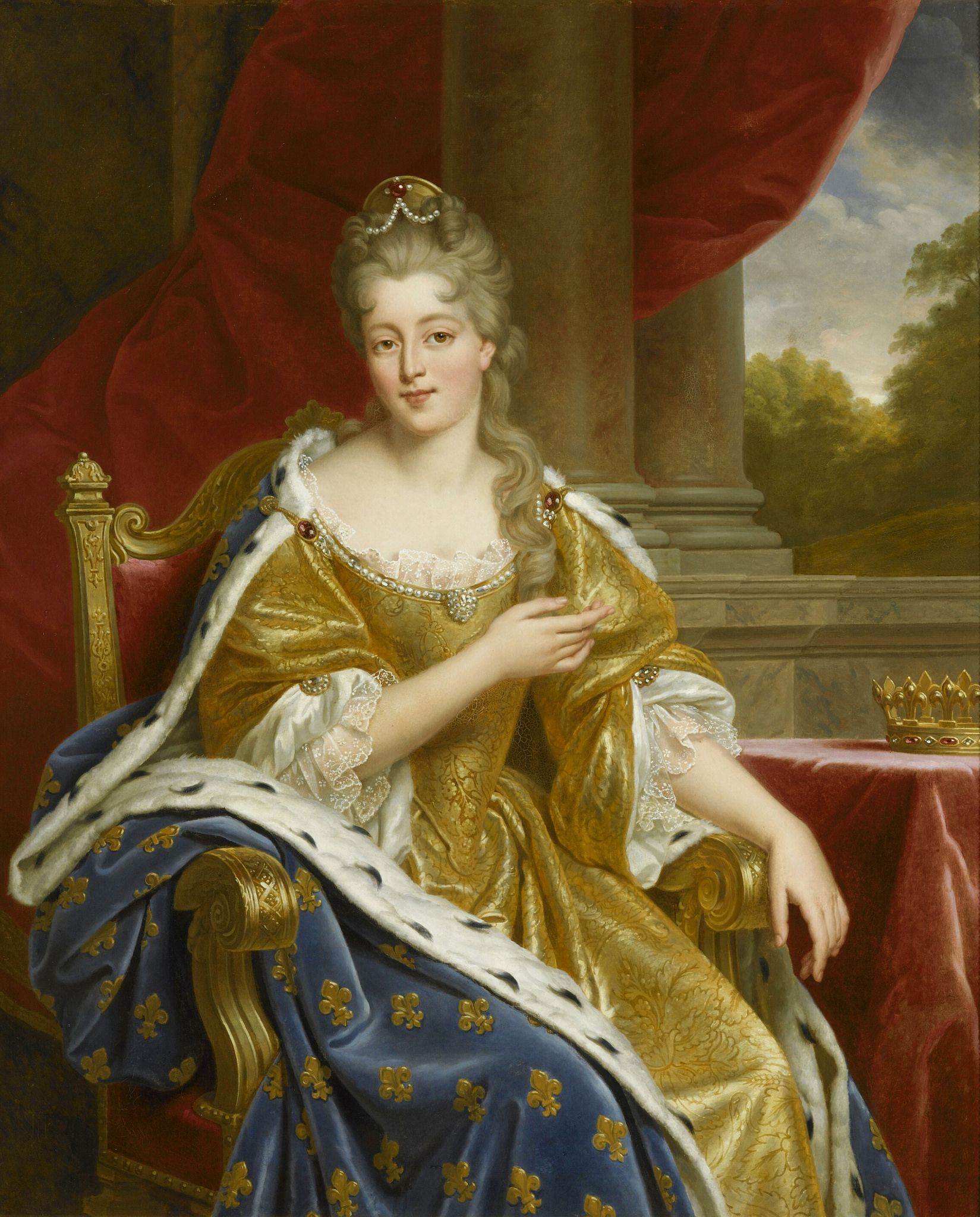
The Duchess of Orléans (1834)

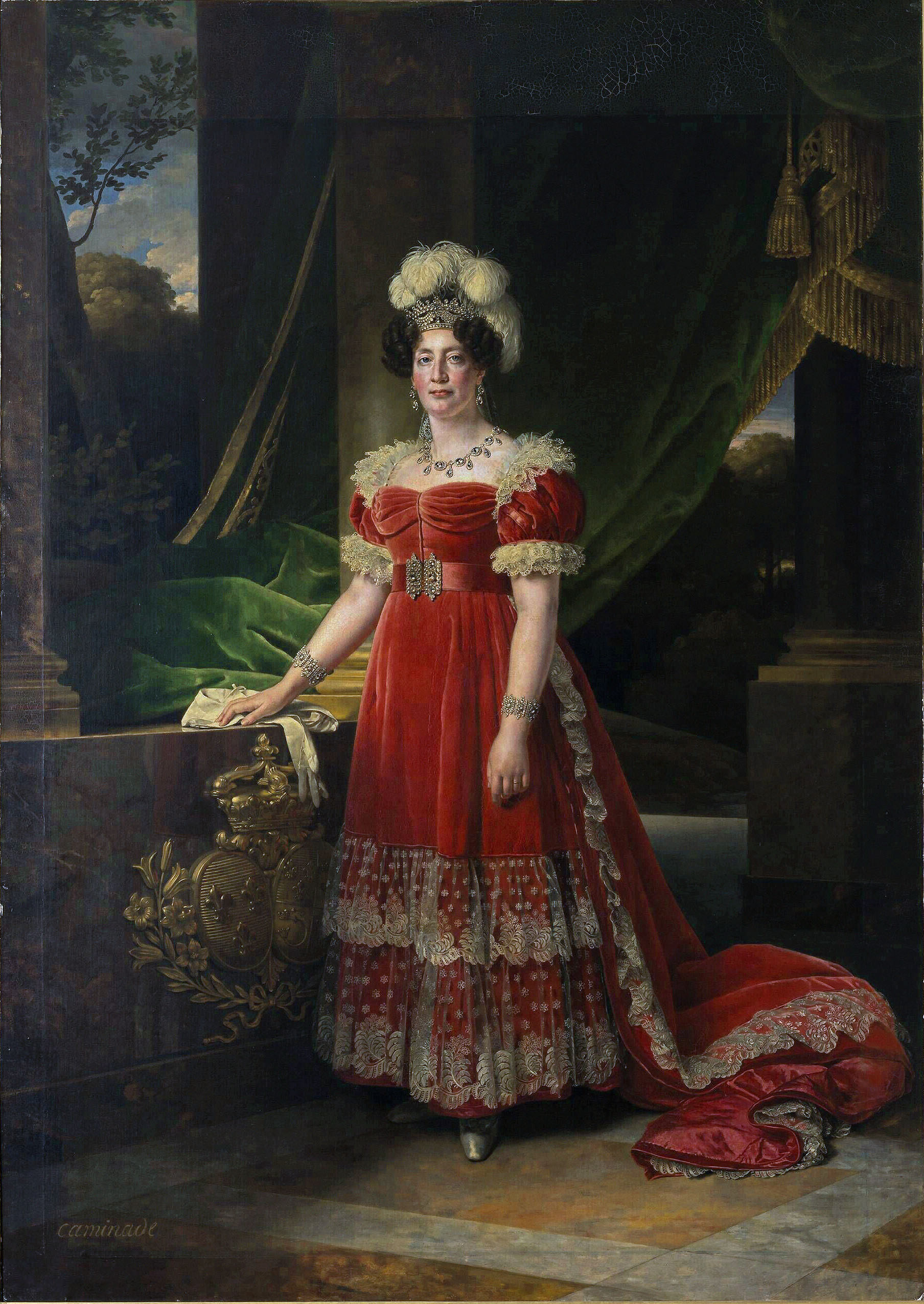
Marie-Thérèse, Duchess of Angoulême, (1827)

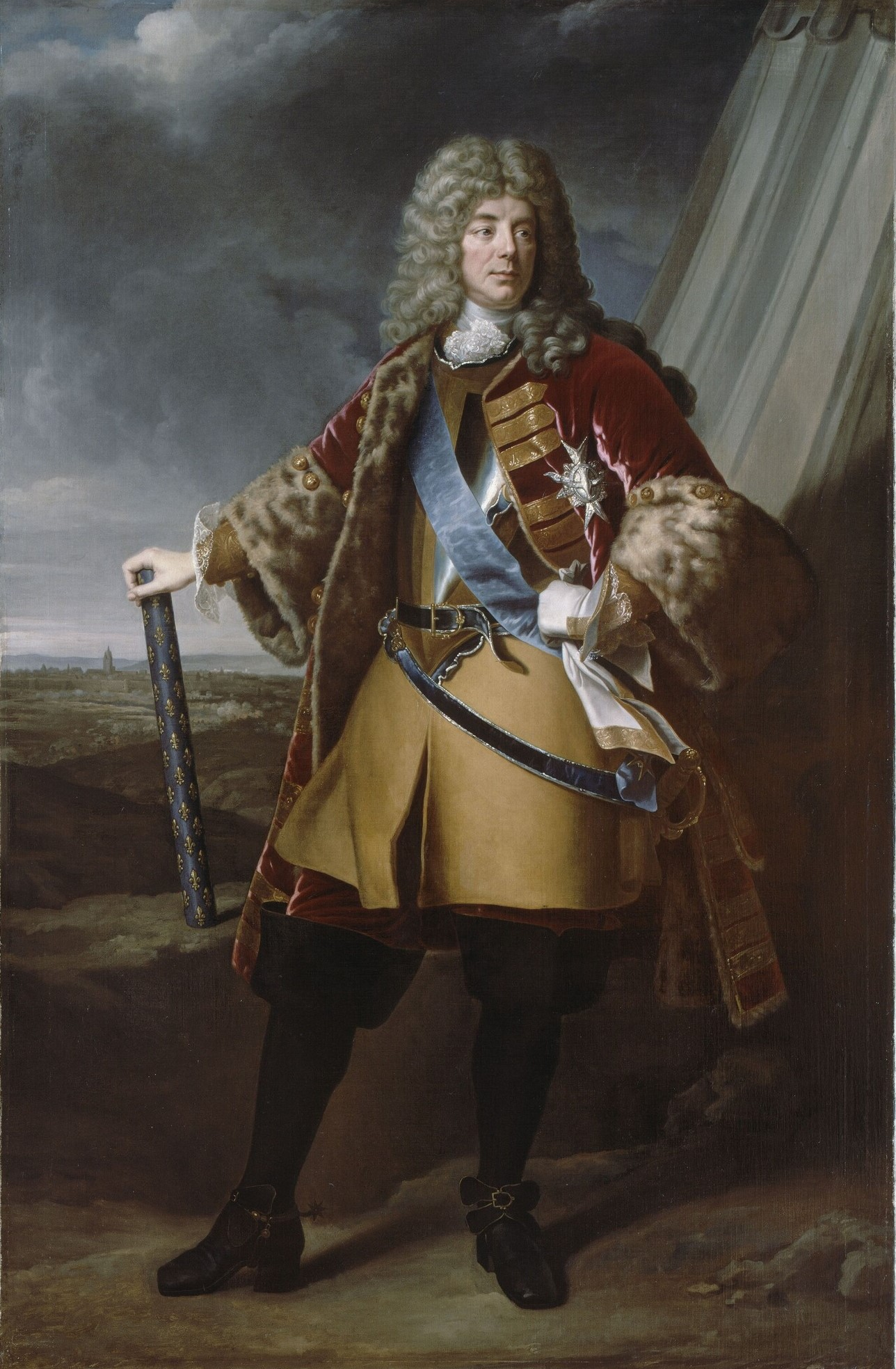
François de Neufville, Duke of Villeroy, Marshal of France, (1834/1835)

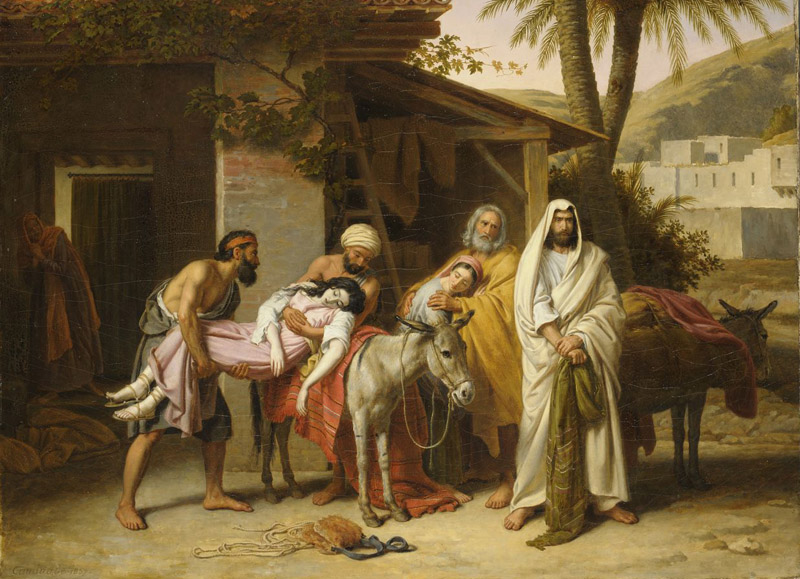
The Levite of Ephraim, (1837)

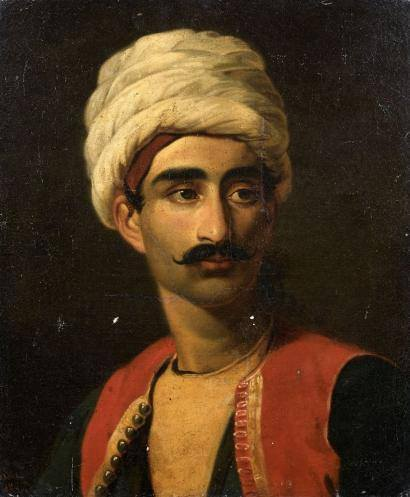
Presumed portrait of Hassan, guardian of the giraffe offered to King Charles X of France by Muhammad Ali of Egypt, (1827)
