= Gaglardi =

Gaglardi is a surname. Notable people with the surname include:

- Phil Gaglardi (1913–1995), Canadian politician
- Tom Gaglardi (born 1967), Canadian business executive

== See also ==
- Gagliardi
