= Giovanni Battista Marchetti =

Italian painter (1730–1800)

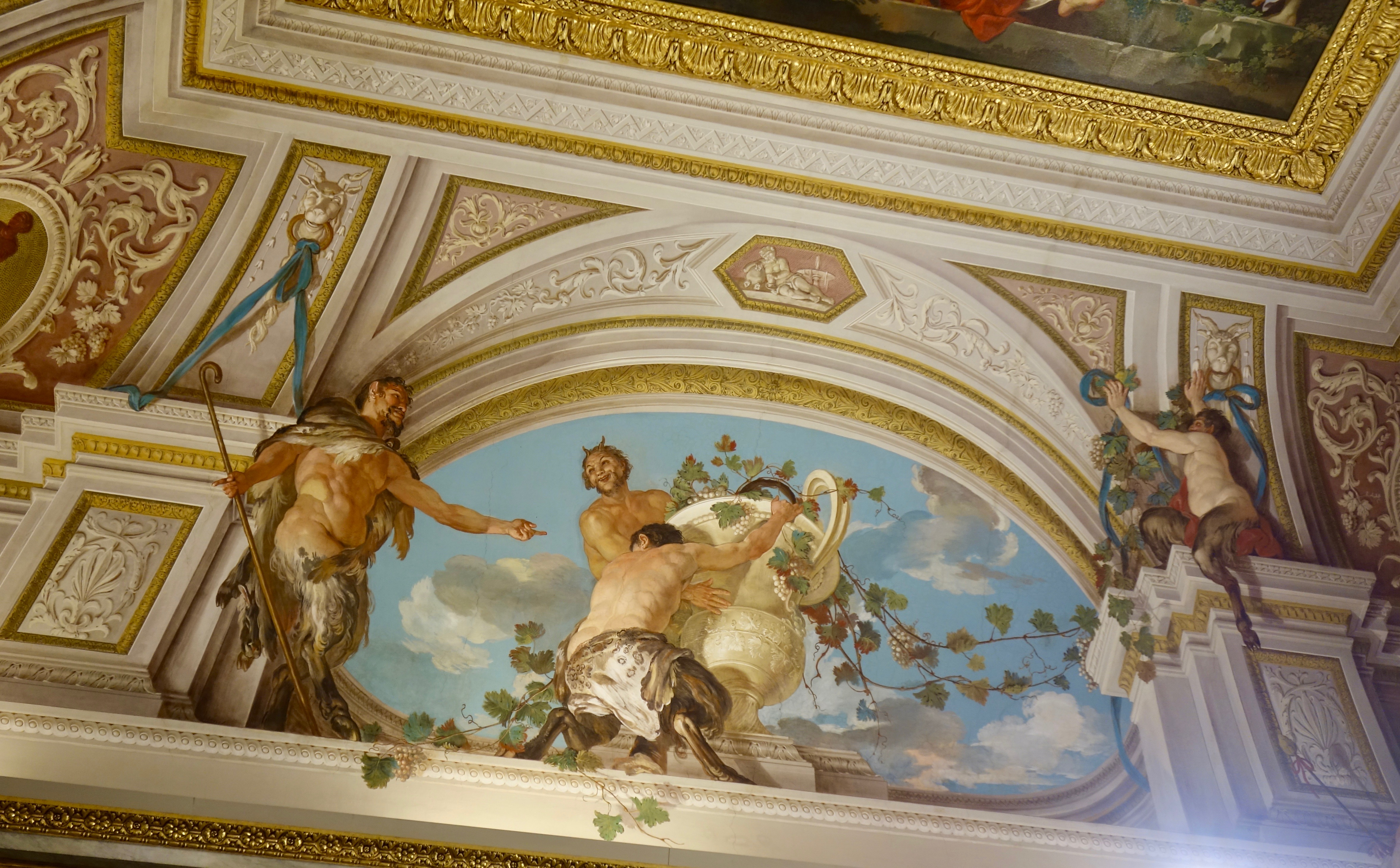
Sala del Sileno, Galleria Borghese

Giovanni Battista Marchetti (1730 – 1800) was an Italian painter, active mainly as a decorative fresco painter in a neoclassical-style in Siena and Rome.

He was born in Siena and died in Rome. There he was employed in decorations of the Oratory of the Archconfraternity of Santa Caterina da Siena, the Sala di Psiche in the Villa Borghese, and the church of Santa Caterina da Siena a Via Giulia (1769). He also frescoed some rooms in the Palazzo Gori Pannilini in Siena with scenes from Tasso's Gerusalemme Liberata. The work in the Borghese was along with Tommaso Conca. In 1764, along with Leonardo Massimiliano de Vegni, he painted the Theater of Montalcino, and the cupola of the church of the Madonna della Rosa in Chianciano Terme.

A distinct GB Marchetti, born in Predore near Bergamo in 1686, was an architect in Brescia. He was the father of Antonio Marchetti.
