= Palma il Giovane =

Venetian painter (1548/50–1628)

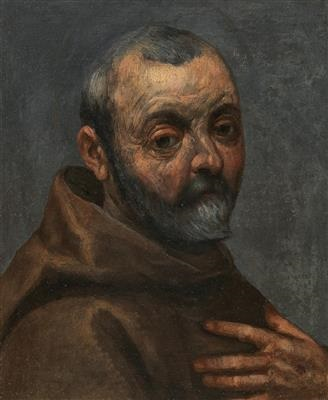
- Supposed self-portrait as a monk
- Born: Iacopo Negretti; 1548/50; Venice, Republic of Venice
- Died: 14 October 1628 (aged 77–80); Venice, Republic of Venice
- Known for: Painting
- Movement: High Renaissance

Iacopo Negretti (1548/50 – 14 October 1628), best known as Jacopo or Giacomo Palma il Giovane or simply Palma Giovane ('Young Palma'), was an Italian painter from Venice and a notable exponent of the Venetian school.

After Tintoretto's death (1594), Palma became Venice's dominant artist, perpetuating his style. Outside Venice, he received numerous commissions in the area of Bergamo, then part of the Venetian Domini di Terraferma, and in Central Europe, most prominently from the connoisseur emperor Rudolph II in Prague.

== Biography ==
Palma was born in Venice. Born into a family of painters, he was the great-nephew of the painter Palma Vecchio ("Old Palma") and the son of Antonio Nigreti (1510/15–1575/85), a minor painter who was himself the pupil of the elder Palma's workshop foreman Bonifacio de' Pitati and who after Bonifazio's death (1553) inherited Bonifacio's shop and clientele; the younger Palma seems to have polished his style making copies after Titian.

In 1567, Guidobaldo II della Rovere, duke of Urbino, recognised Palma's talents, supporting him for four years and sending him to Rome, where he remained until about 1572. Shedding most remnants of Roman manner after his return to Venice, Palma adopted the inescapable models and mannerisms of Tintoretto. His early biographers assert that he found a place in the ageing Titian's workshop; when the master died, Palma stepped in to finish his last work, the Pietà in the Accademia, Venice. Palma's first major public commission arrived after a 1577 fire in the Doge's Palace: three scenes in its grand council hall. By the mid-1580s, he had digested Tintoretto's versatile figure postures and Titian's thick surfaces, emphasis on light, and loose brushstroke. In Palma Giovane's output, Freedberg also detects "an occasional discursive opulence à la Veronese; and inclinations towards descriptive naturalism à la Bassano."

Rejecting Mannerism in the 1580s, he embraced a reformist naturalism. He varied the ingeniously synthesised amalgam according to subject matter and patrons' own eclectic and conservative tastes, with "virtuoso skill and a facile intelligence".

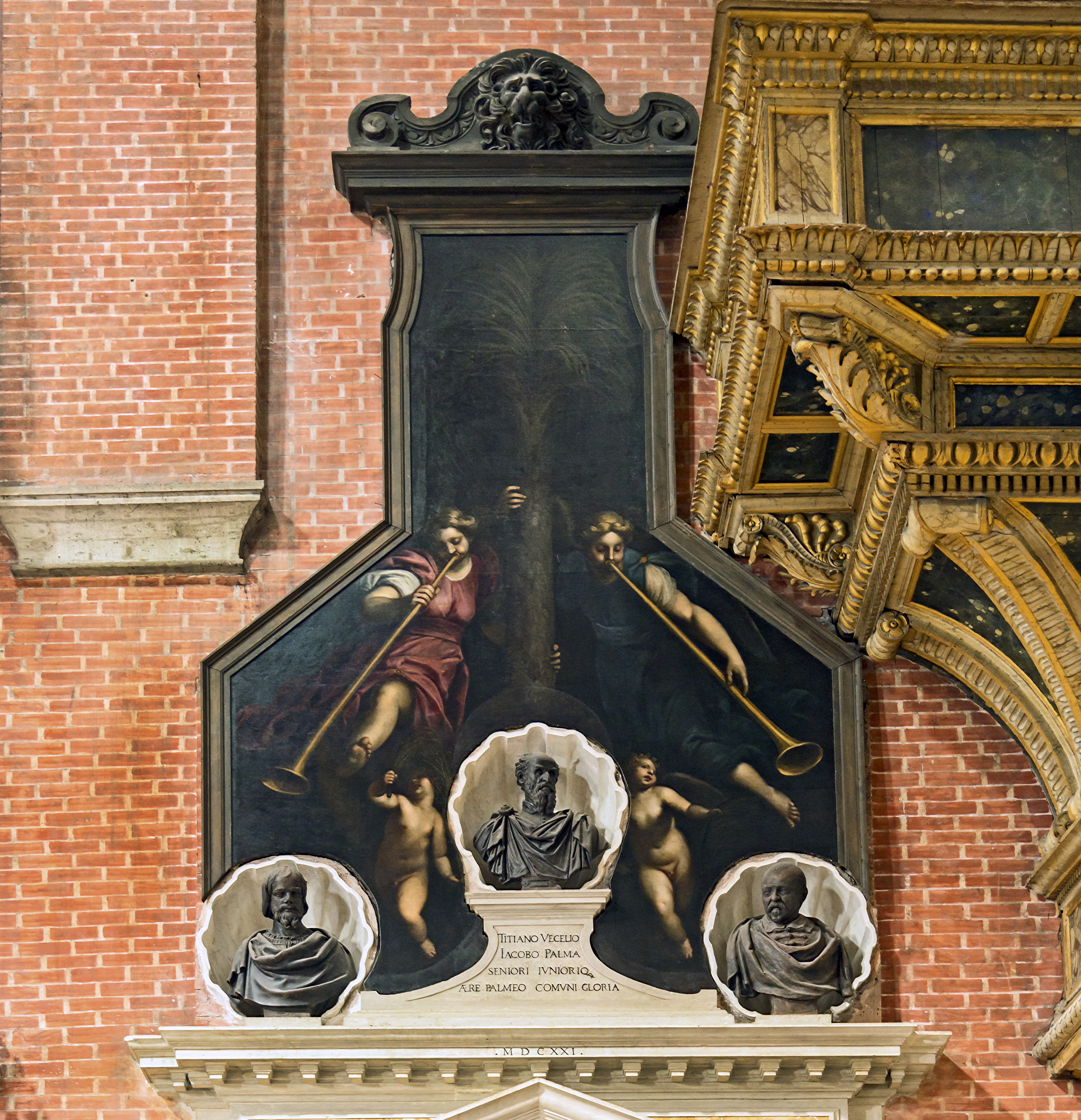
Monument to Palma il Giovane, Basilica di San Giovanni e Paolo

He worked alongside Veronese and Tintoretto on the decorations in the Doge's Palace, where he came to know fully the Venetian tradition. From 1580–90, he painted cycles of large canvases either for Venetian Schools or sacred buildings (the sacristies of San Giacomo dell'Orio and of the Jesuit church (I Gesuiti, Venice, the Scuola di San Giovanni Evangelista, and the Oratorio dei Crociferi). Thanks to the intelligent way they quoted from Tintoretto and their own narrative drive, these are Palma the Younger's best works. After this, he went back to official commissions at the Doge's Palace. Among these, there is the portrait of Pope Pius V, commissioned by the Bellanti Counts, an influential family who gave four "Capitani del popolo" to the city of Siena in the Middle Ages. After three centuries in Tuscany, it was bought by Sir Robert Dick in 1842. After almost two hundred years, the portrait was bought from Bonham's in London by Roberto Gagliardi, and returned to Tuscany where it is now held at the Chianciano Museum of Art, a few kilometres from Siena.

Palma il Giovane went on to organise his own large studio, which he used to produce a repetitive series of religious and allegorical pictures that can be found throughout the territory of the Venetian Republic. One of these works is Venus with a Mirror (after Titian). After 1600, he painted mythologies for a small circle of intellectuals. After the death of Tintoretto in 1594, he remained one of the leading painters in the City of Venice. He was commissioned to complete Titian's unfinished Pietà.

He was interred in the Basilica di San Giovanni e Paolo, a traditional burial place of the doges. Among his followers was the Brescian painter, Camillo Rama.

== Gallery ==
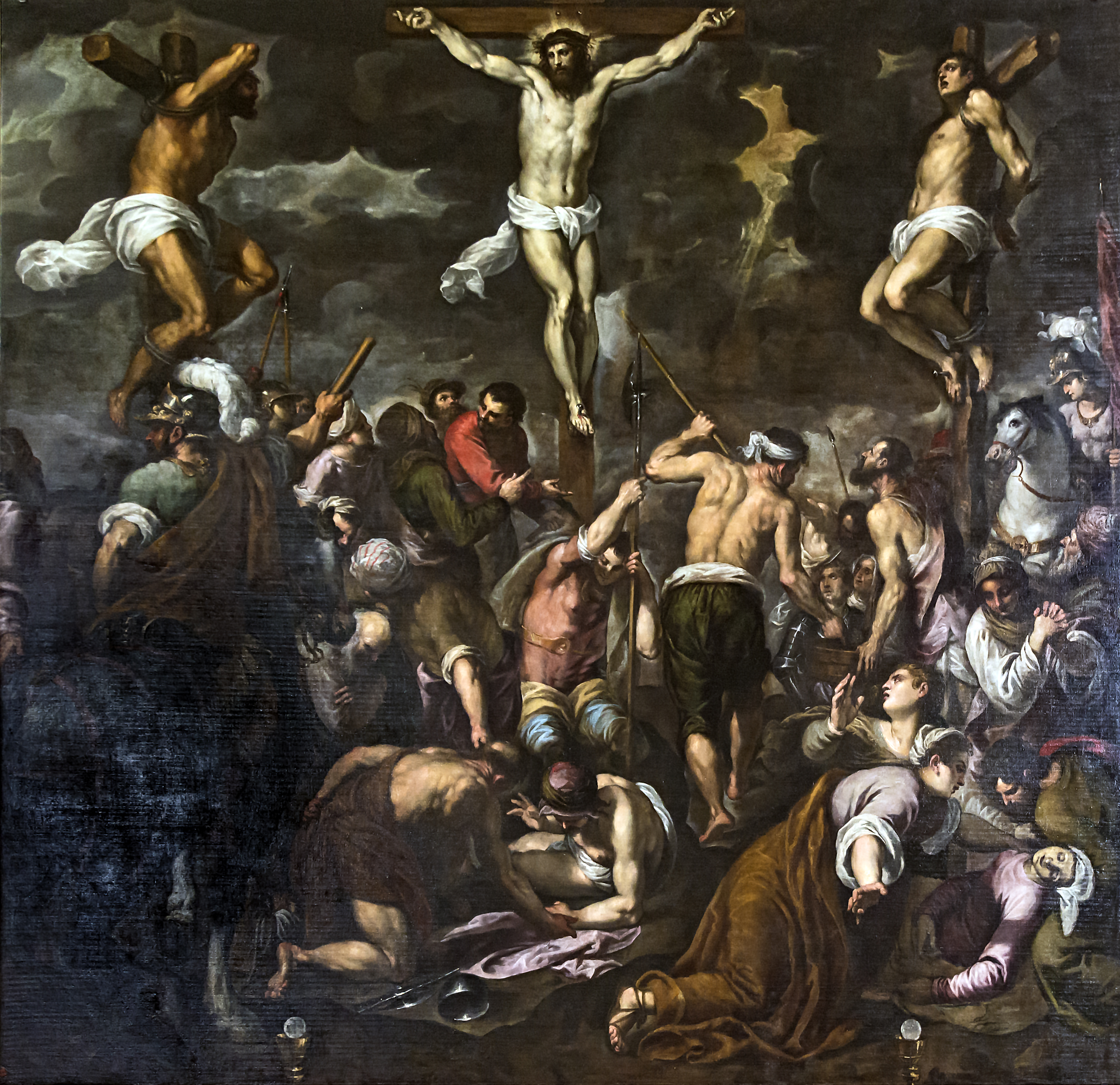
Crucifixion, Madonna dell'Orto

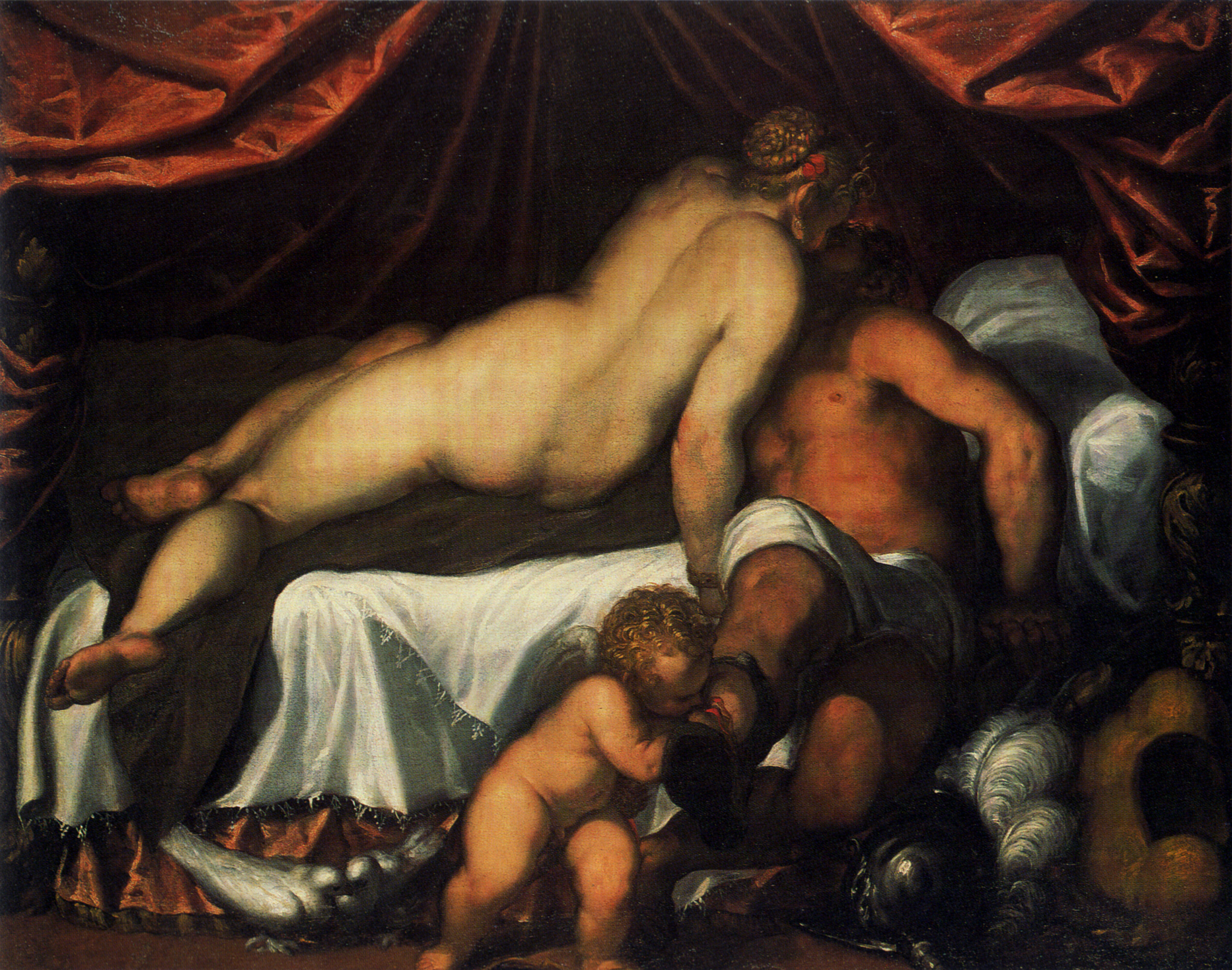
Venus and Mars, c. 1590, The National Gallery, London

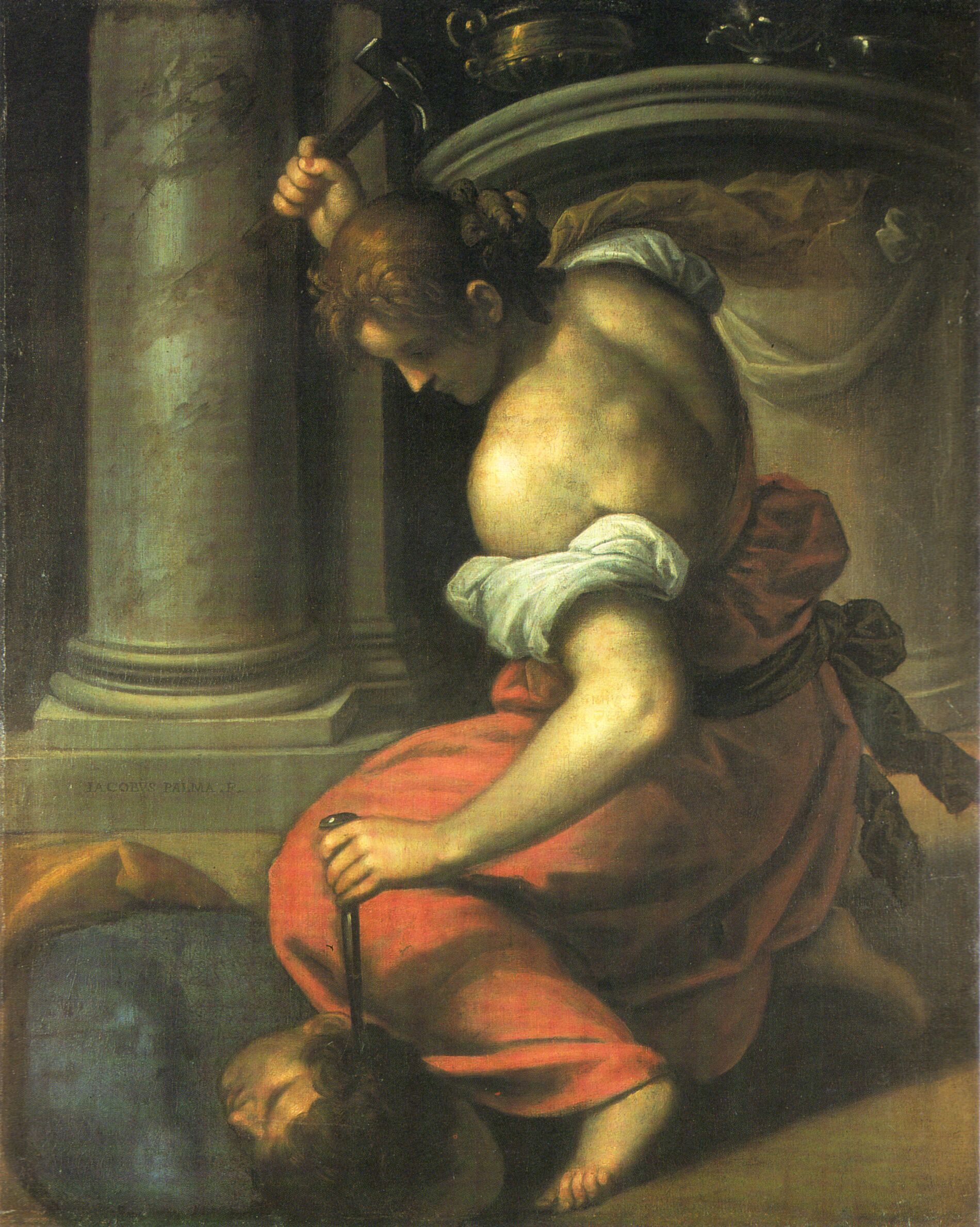
Yael Killing Sisera

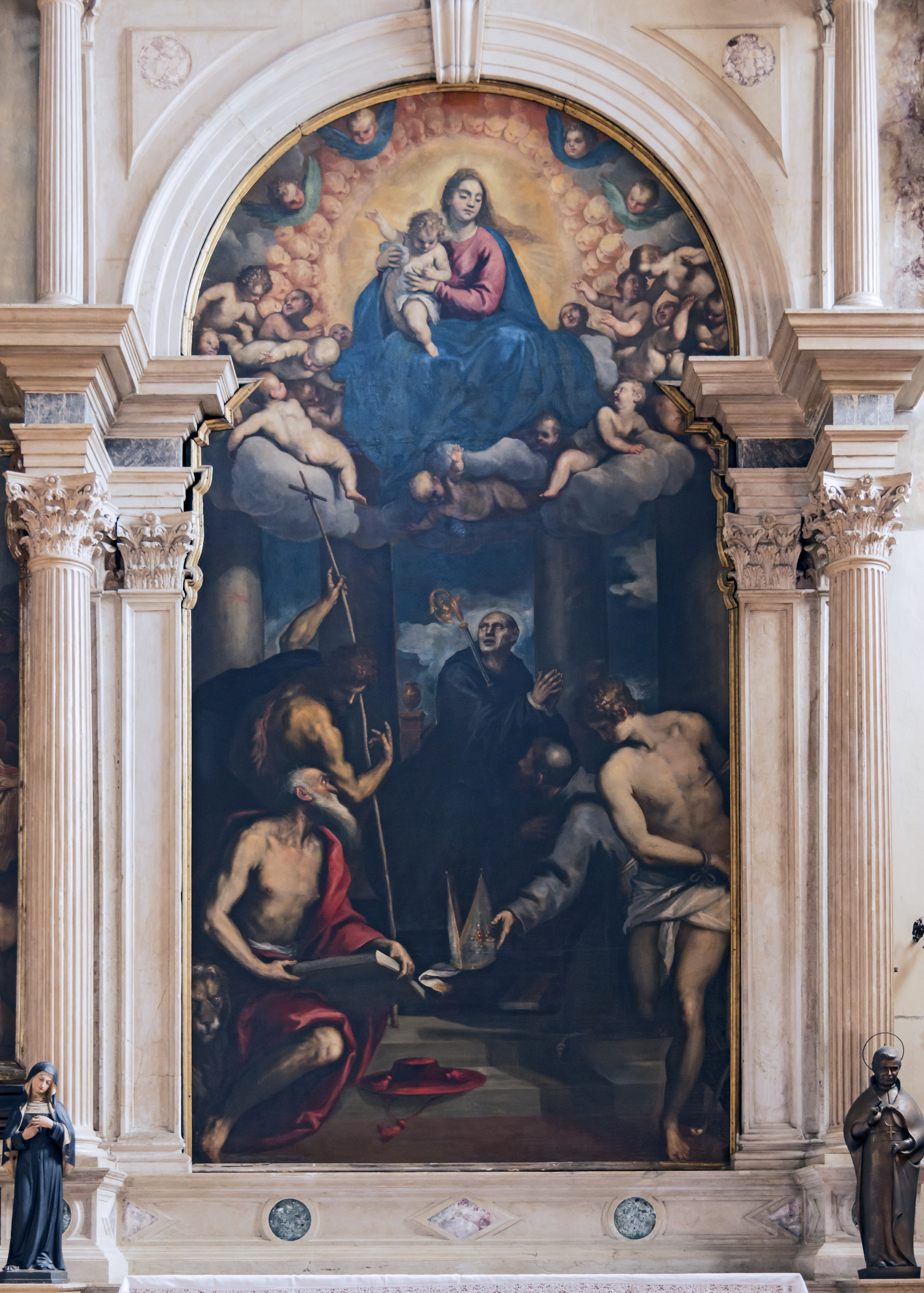
Madonna and Child, Saint Benedict and other saints, 1605, San Zaccaria, Venice

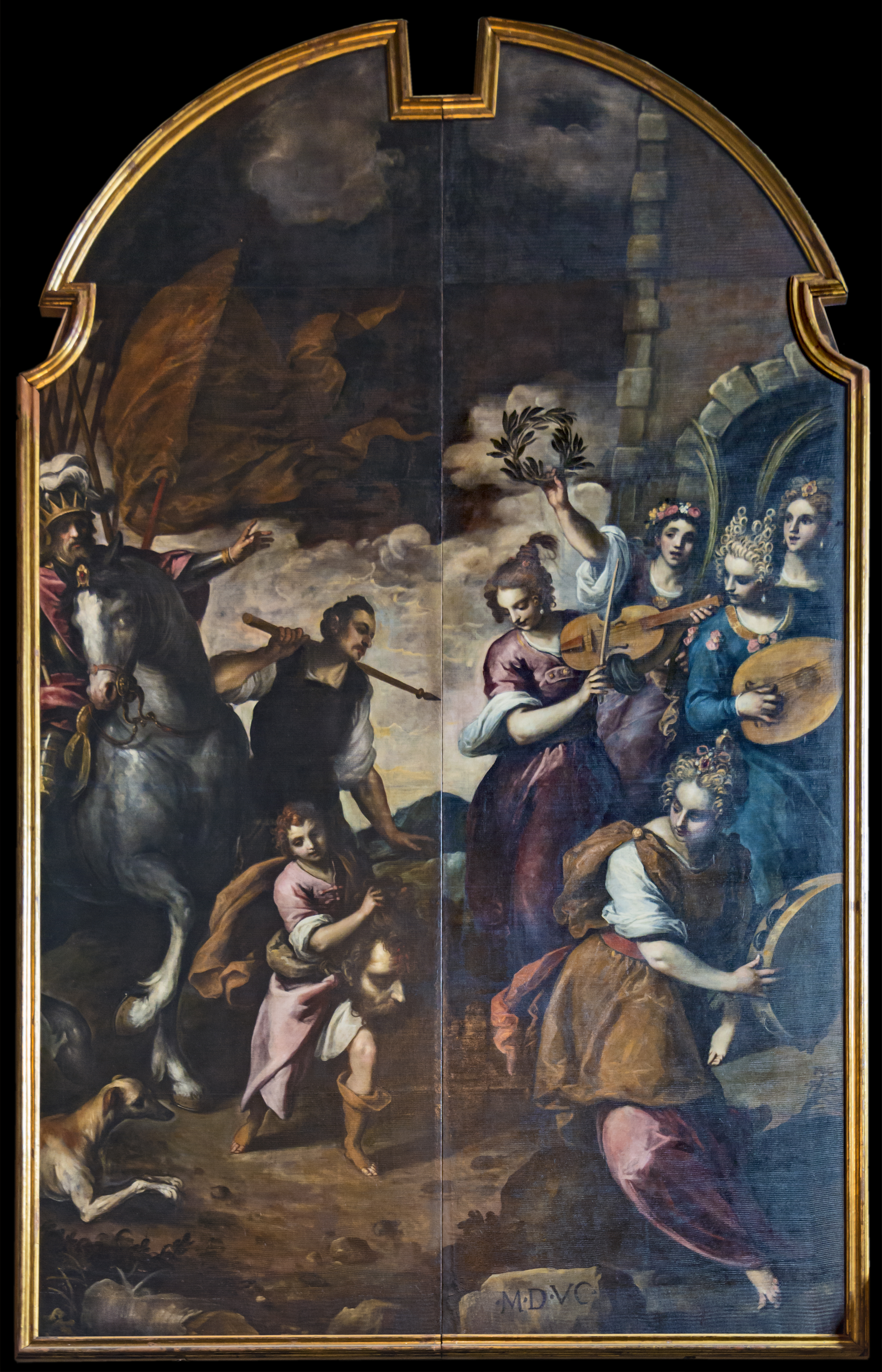
Davide vincitore...San Zaccaria, Venice

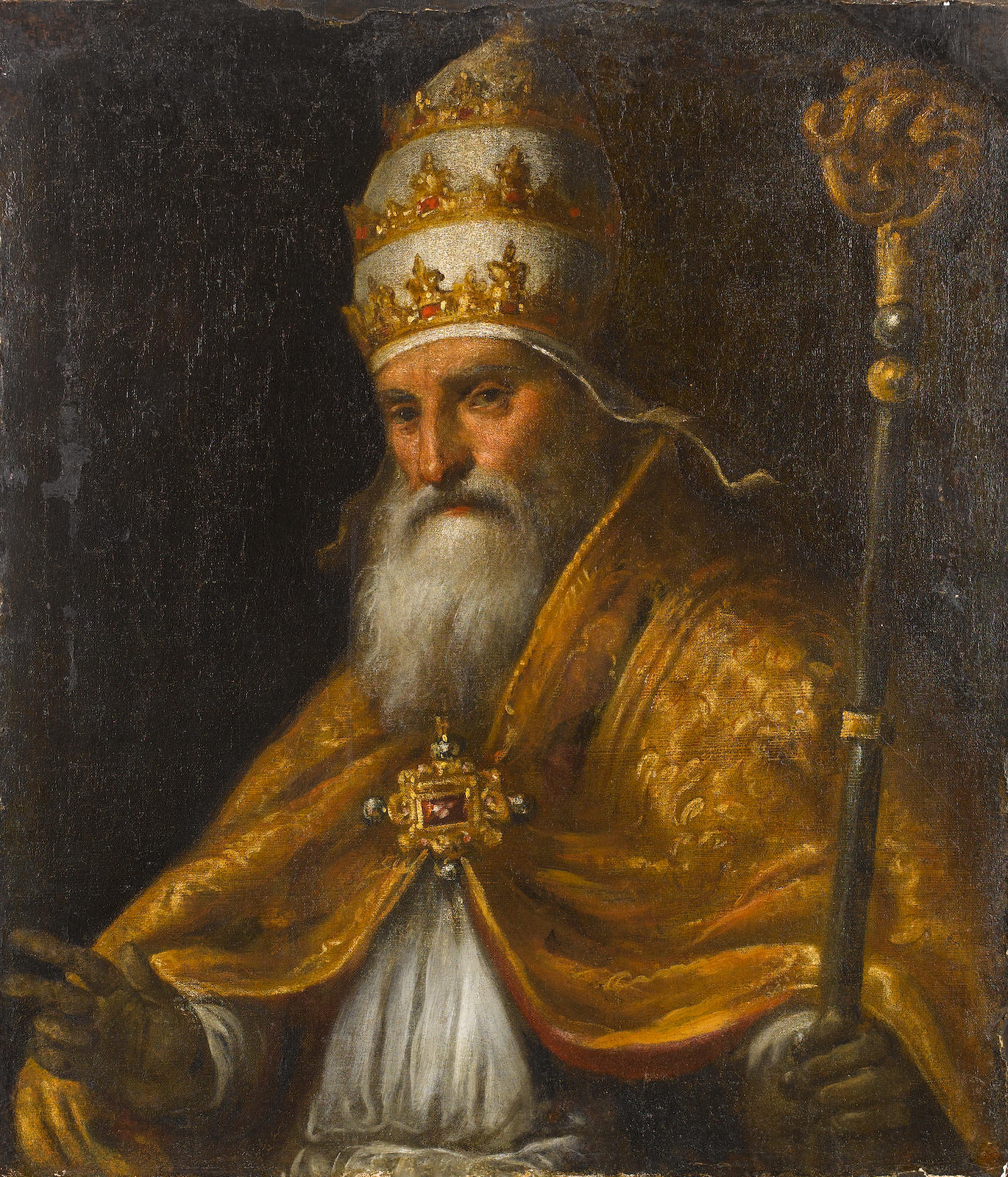
Pope Saint Pius V

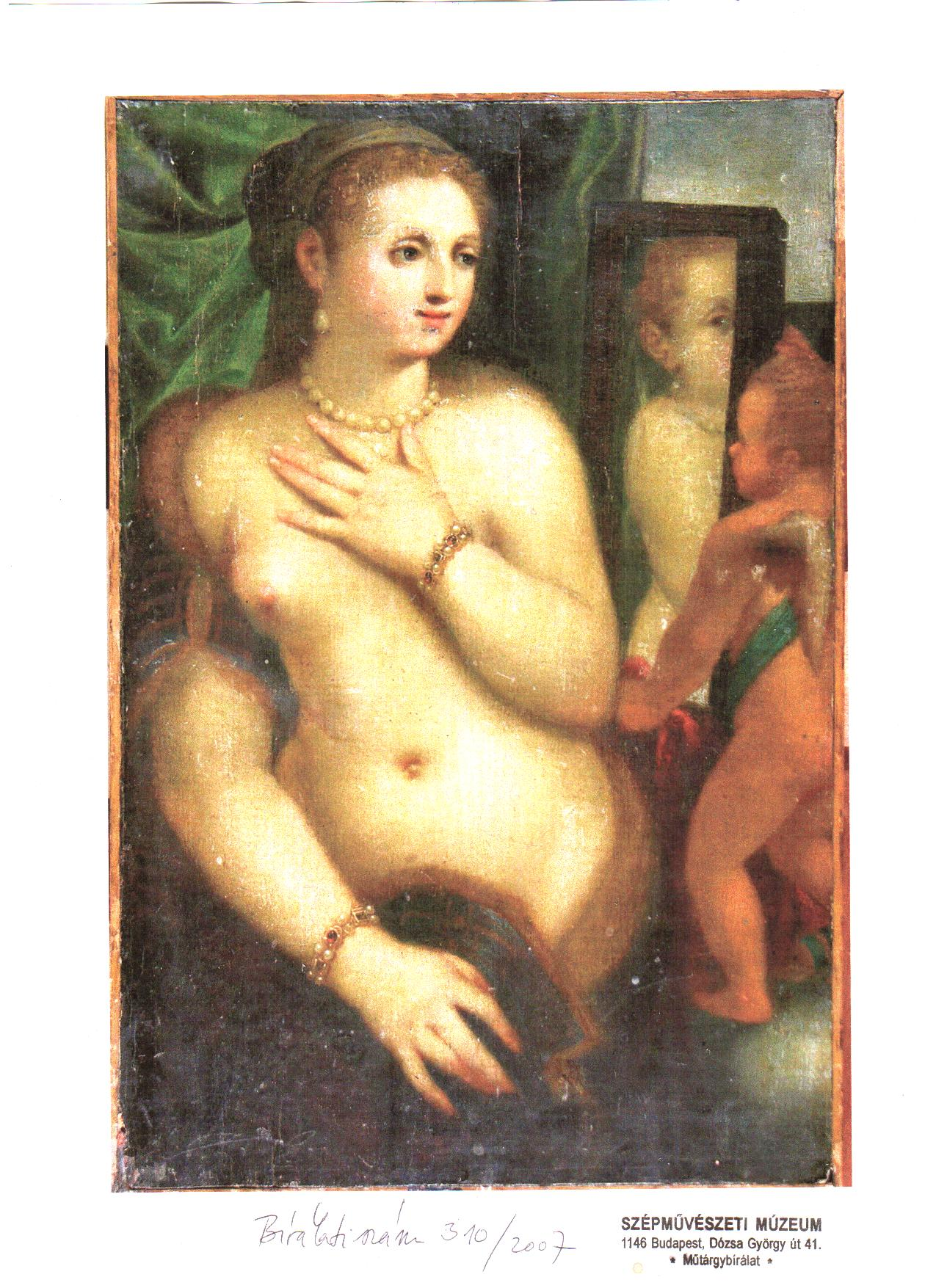
Venus with a Mirror

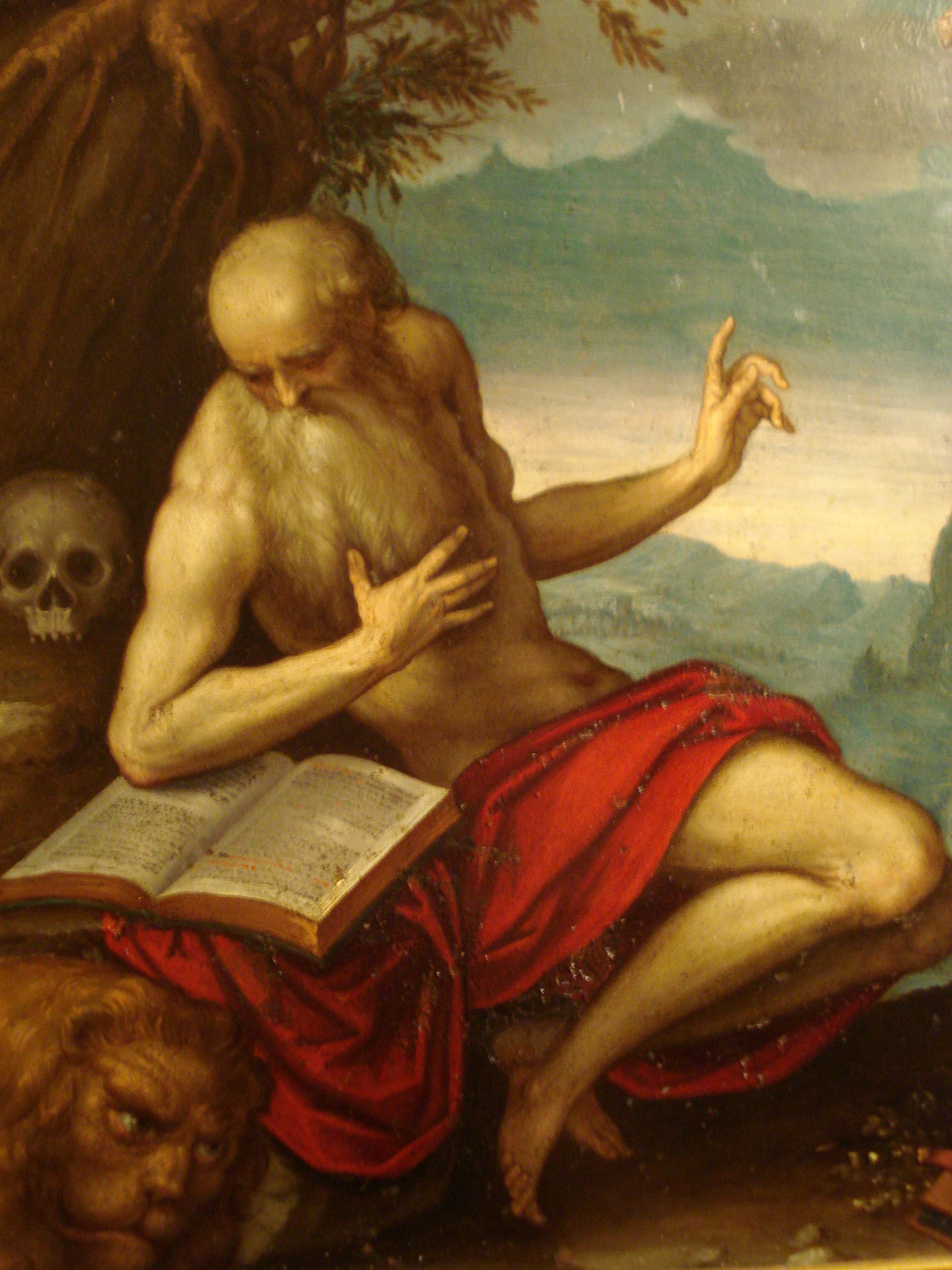
Saint Jerome in the Wilderness, c. 1590–1595

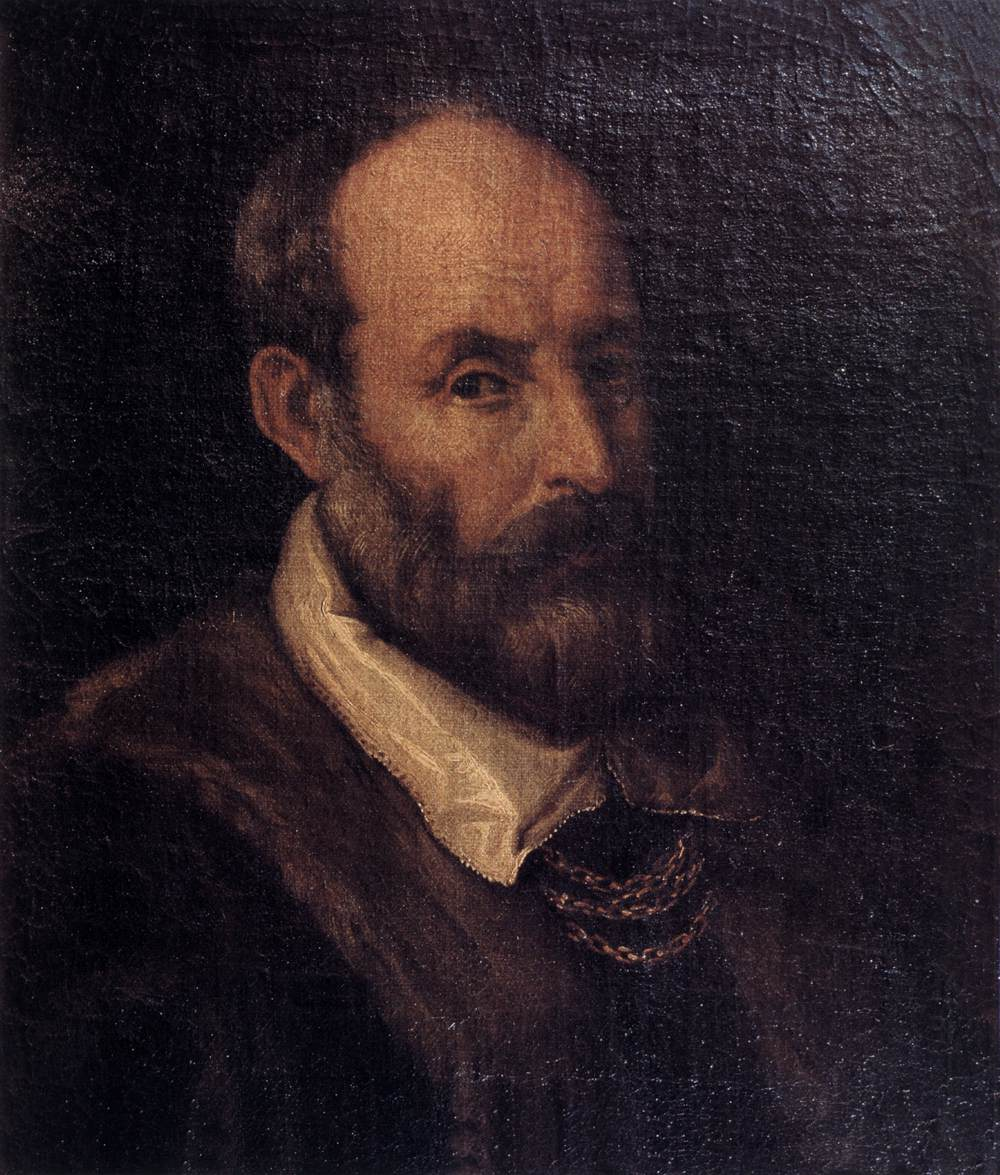
Paolo Veronese, c. 1600–1610

== See also ==
- Palma Vecchio
