= Gagliardi =

Gagliardi is an Italian surname. Notable people with the surname include:

- Achille Gagliardi (1537–1607), Italian ascetic writer and spiritual director
- Alejandro Gagliardi (born 1989), Argentine footballer
- Alyssa Gagliardi (born 1992), American-born women’s ice hockey player
- Bernardino Gagliardi (1609–1660), Italian painter
- Domenico Gagliardi (c. 1660–c. 1735), Italian anatomist
- Ed Gagliardi (1952–2014), American bass guitarist
- Filippo Gagliardi (1606–1659), Italian painter of the Baroque period
- Francesco Gagliardi (born 1974), Italian film director, screenwriter and film producer
- Frank Gagliardi (1931–2011), American jazz drummer and percussionist
- Emanuel Gagliardi (1885–1942), Croatian and Yugoslav politician
- Emmanuelle Gagliardi (born 1976), retired professional Swiss tennis player
- John Gagliardi (disambiguation), multiple people
- Laura Gagliardi (born 1968), Italian theoretical and computational chemist
- Laurent Gagliardi (born 1948), Canadian screenwriter and film director
- Lee Parsons Gagliardi (1918–1998), federal judge for the United States District Court
- Pat Gagliardi (born 1950), Democratic member of the Michigan House of Representatives from 1983 through 1998
- Peppino Gagliardi (1940–2023), Italian singer
- Pietro Gagliardi (1809–1890), Italian painter and architect
- Richard Gagliardi (1933–2018), retired American ice hockey player and coach
- Roberto Gagliardi, Italian-born art dealer based in London
- Rosario Gagliardi (1698–1762), Italian architect
- Sara Gagliardi (born 1958), legislator in the U.S. state of Colorado

== Other ==
- Gagliardi Trophy
- Gagliardo
