= Church of the Immaculate Conception (Chianciano Terme) =

- Chiesa dell'immacolata concezione (Italian)
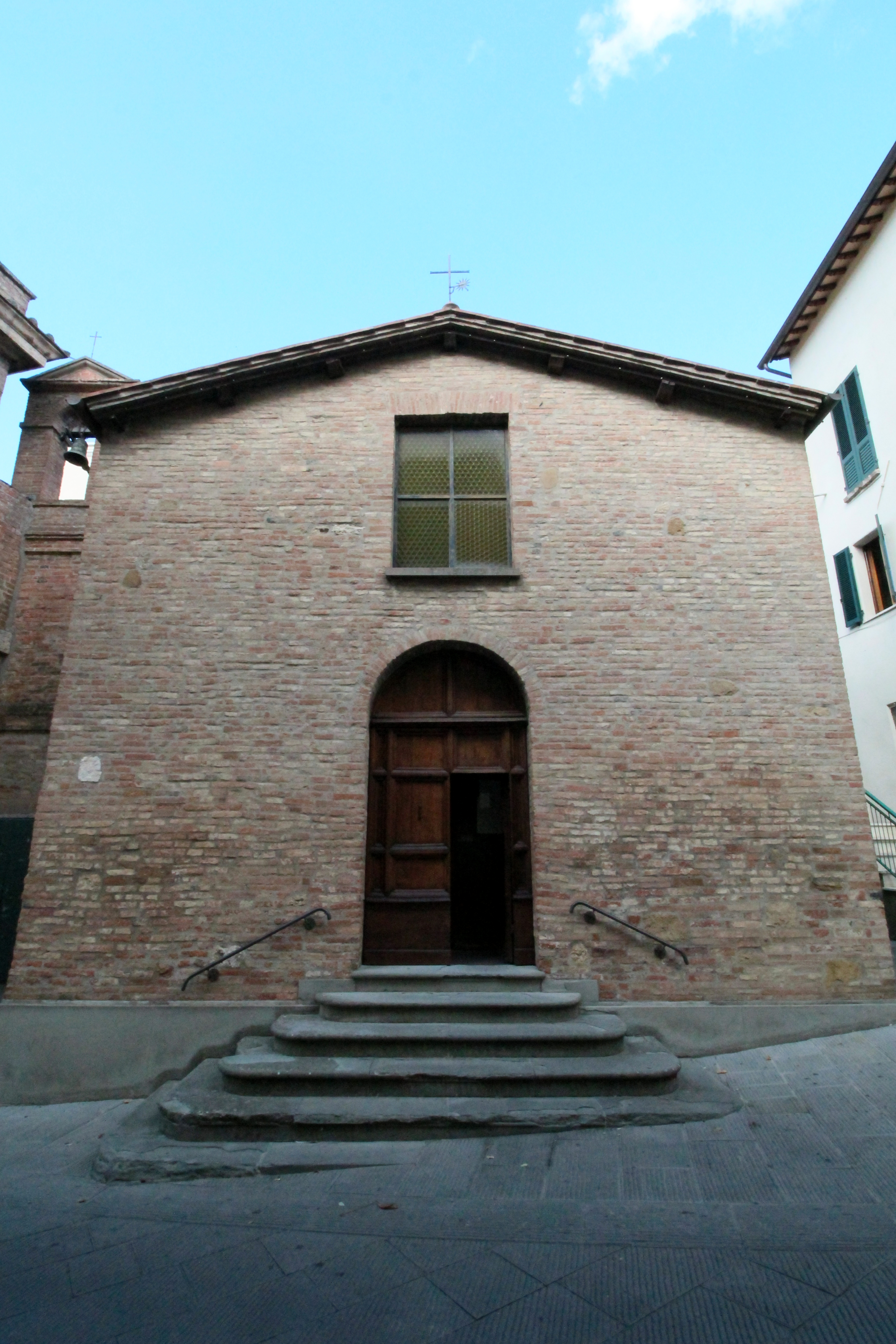
- Facade of Church of the Immaculate Conception
- Church of the Immaculate Conception
- 43°03′30″N 11°49′46″E
- Location: Chianciano Terme, Tuscany
- Country: Italy
- Denomination: Latin Church
- Tradition: Roman Rite

Architecture
- Architectural type: Church

Administration
- Archdiocese: Archdiocese of Siena-Colle di Val d'Elsa-Montalcino

The Church of the Immaculate Conception (Italian: Chiesa dell'Immacolata Concezione), also called Church of Borgo alle Taverne, is located in Chianciano Terme.

== History ==
Formerly in this place there was a hospital mentioned in 1272, then in 1475 a church dedicated to Saint Mary of the Star (Italian: Santa Maria della Stella) was built. The building was destroyed by the Florentine-imperial army during the War of Siena in 1555 along with the tower above it. Then it was restored in 1580 and took the name of Church of Death (Italian: Chiesa della Morte). The present dedication to the Immaculate Conception was given after the restoration of 1958.

== Description ==
The building has a gabled brick façade set on a base of six steps. A rectangular window surmounts the round-arched portal. On the left stands a bell gable, also made of bricks. The single-nave interior has a wide serliana that frames the main altar and two other altars on the sides. The high altar, made during the 16th-century remodeling of the church, features two black marble columns supporting an entablature and a broken curvilinear tympanum that houses a rectangular slab with a carved cherub in the center, while the two side altars were built later. Artworks no longer on site Several paintings were once preserved inside the church. On the high altar was an oil painting depicting the 'Annunciation initialed by Niccolò Betti and dated (1581) on the base of the lectern, where the coat of arms of the Confraternity of Good Death that ran the church also appears. Also belonging to the church were a Holy Family on canvas attributed to Galgano Perpignani (18th century) in which Mary and Joseph hand baby Jesus some cherries, a scene probably to be identified as a Rest during the Flight into Egypt, and a detached fresco depicting the Madonna and Child attributed to an early 16th-century Umbrian artist close to Perugino's style. These works were later moved to the Museo della Collegiata, where they are still displayed today. It is also known from archival sources that a fresco known as the Madonna della Pace from the Church of Peace had been transported to the church in 1789. Documents mention the presence in the work of some patron saints and attribute it to Pietro Perugino or Pietro da Cortona, while other scholars refer it to Luca Signorelli.

== Interior ==
Bell gable on the left side of the church Niccolò Betti, Annunciation, oil on canvas, 1581, Chianciano Terme, Museo della Collegiata, from the high altar of the Church of the Immaculate Conception. Coat of arms of the Confraternity of Good Death of Chianciano Terme, detail of the lectern of the Annunciation by Niccolò Betti. Galgano Perpignani (attributed), Holy Family (Rest during the Flight into Egypt?), Chianciano Terme, Museo della Collegiata, from the Church of the Immaculate Conception, 18th century. Early 16th-century Umbrian artist, Madonna and Child, fresco from the Church of the Immaculate Conception, Chianciano Terme, Museo della Collegiata.

== Bibliography ==
- Capece, Maria Gabriella (1997). “Chianciano Terme”. Florence: Franco Cantini Editore, 1997 ISBN 88-8030-100-4, p. 43.
- “Guida d'Italia. Toscana”. Milano: Touring Editore, 2008, pp. 785–788.
- Sebregondi, Ludovica (2001). “Museo della Collegiata di Chianciano Terme” in “Musei e raccolte d’arte sacra in Toscana”. Florence: Giunti, 2001, pp. 528–532.
- ""Luoghi della Fede"". Regione Toscana.
