= Gagliardo =

Gagliardo is an Italian surname. Notable people with the surname include:

- Emilio Gagliardo (1930–2008), Italian mathematician
- Giovanna Gagliardo (born 1943), Italian film director
- Maximiliano Gagliardo (born 1983), Argentine footballer
- Ruth Garver Gagliardo (1895–1980), American educator

== See also ==
- Gagliardi
