= Tommaso Conca =

Italian painter (1734–1822)

Tommaso Maria Conca (1734–1822) was an Italian painter and draftsman, active mostly in Rome.

== Biography ==
Tommaso Conca was born in Gaeta, one of the youngest of some eleven siblings, to Giovanni Conca and Anna Laura Scarsella di Castro. His father was a painter and cousin to the more famous painter Sebastiano Conca; the two were Tommaso's first teachers in Baroque painting. In 1770, Tommaso was made member of Accademia di San Luca, Rome's guild of painters.

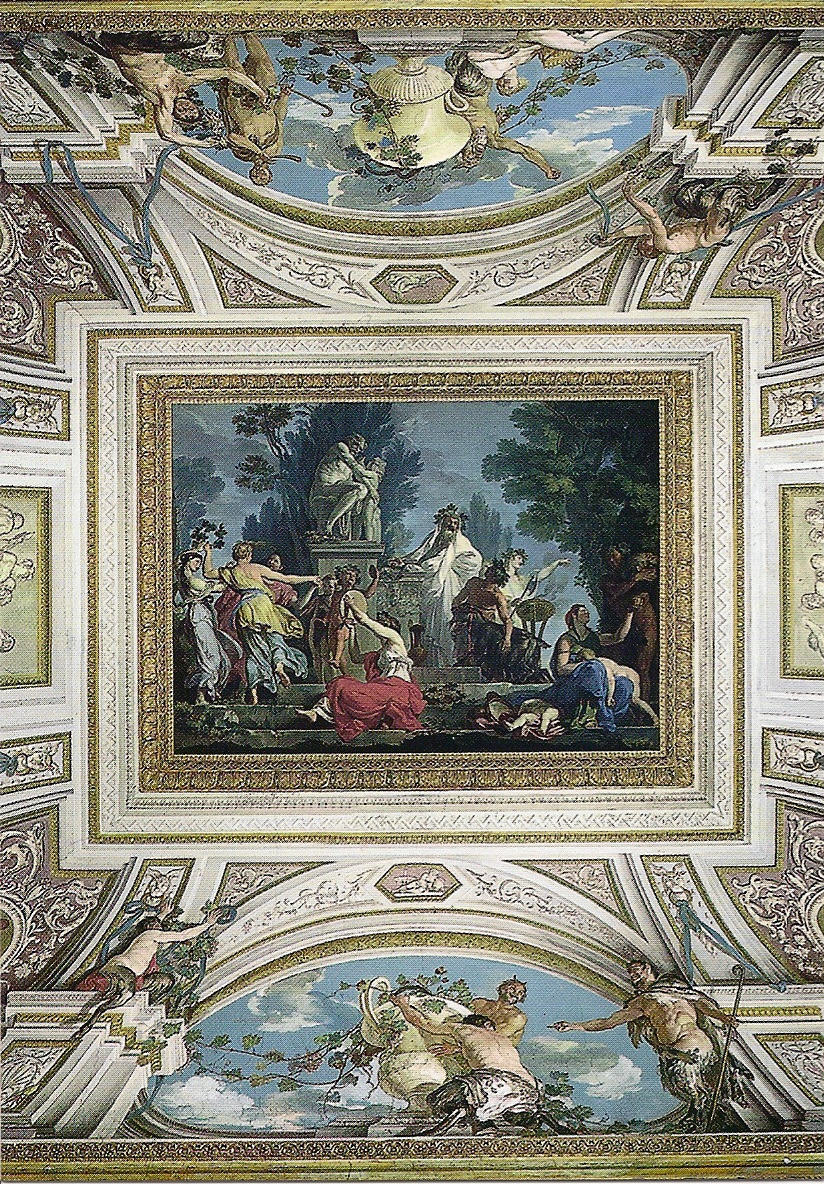
Sacrifice to Silenus (1775–1778)

From 1775 to 1782 he worked for Marcantonio Borghese, painting the ceilings of two rooms in the renovated Galleria Borghese, in collaboration with Giovanni Battista Marchetti. In Sala del Sileno, above a Roman statue of Silenus he set scenes from that character, along with Bacchus and his followers. In the Sala Egizia, dedicated to Egyptian sculpture, he represented the Nile, Cybele and astronomical bodies, adorning the space between them with mock Egyptian idols; on the walls he added eight scenes of Egyptian religion and the lives of Marcus Antonius and Cleopatra.

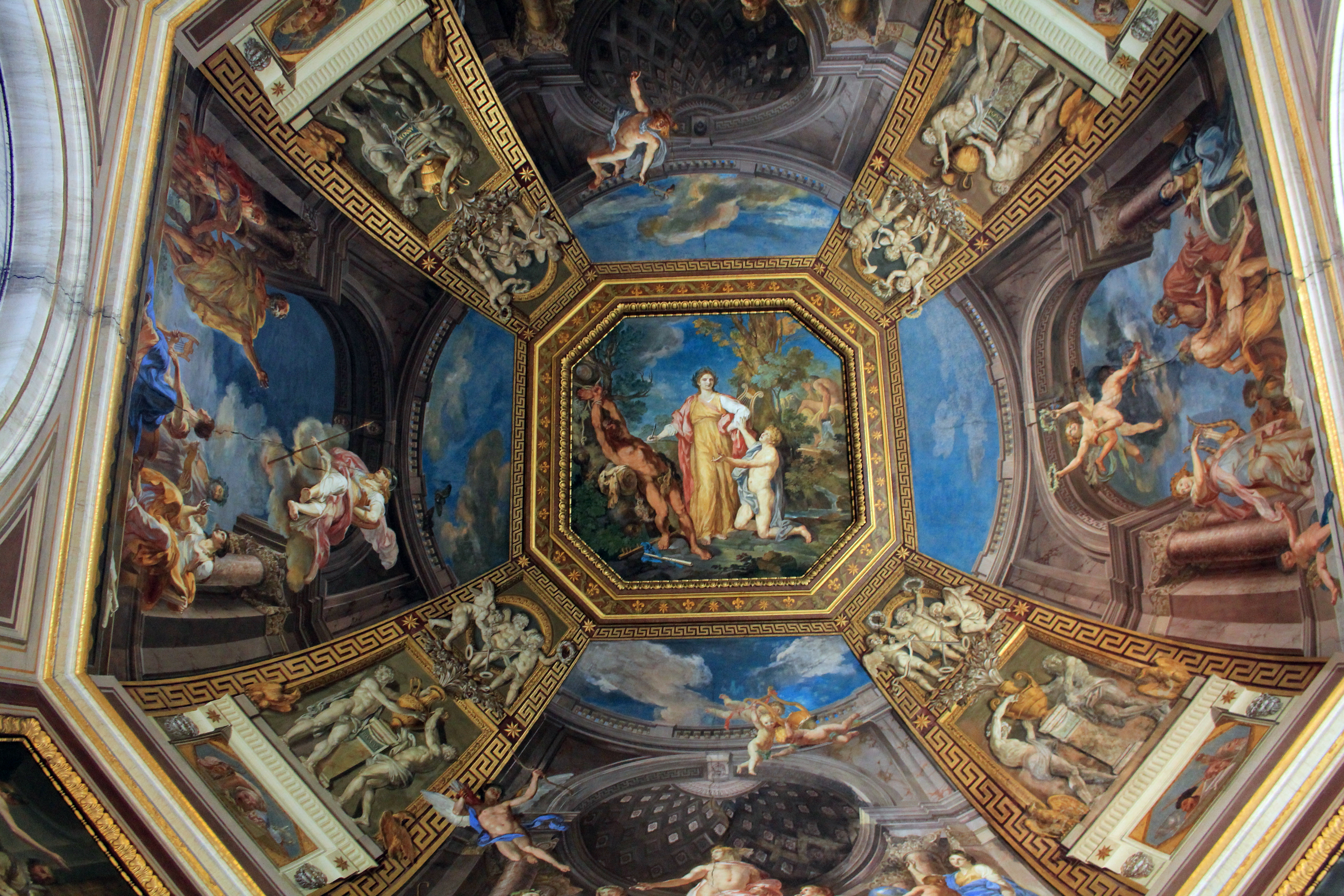
Apollo and the Muses (1782–1787)

Between 1782 and 1787 Conca painted Apollo and the Muses, a fresco decorating Sala delle Muse, a room in the papal Museo Pio-Clementino. At the end of his life, he completed another fresco in the Vatican's Museo Chiaramonti, which celebrates the restitution of paintings that had been taken to Musée Napoléon.

Following Anton Raphael Mengs he shifted to a Neoclassical style. One of his pupils was Camillo Guerra.
