= Palazzo Gori Pannilini =

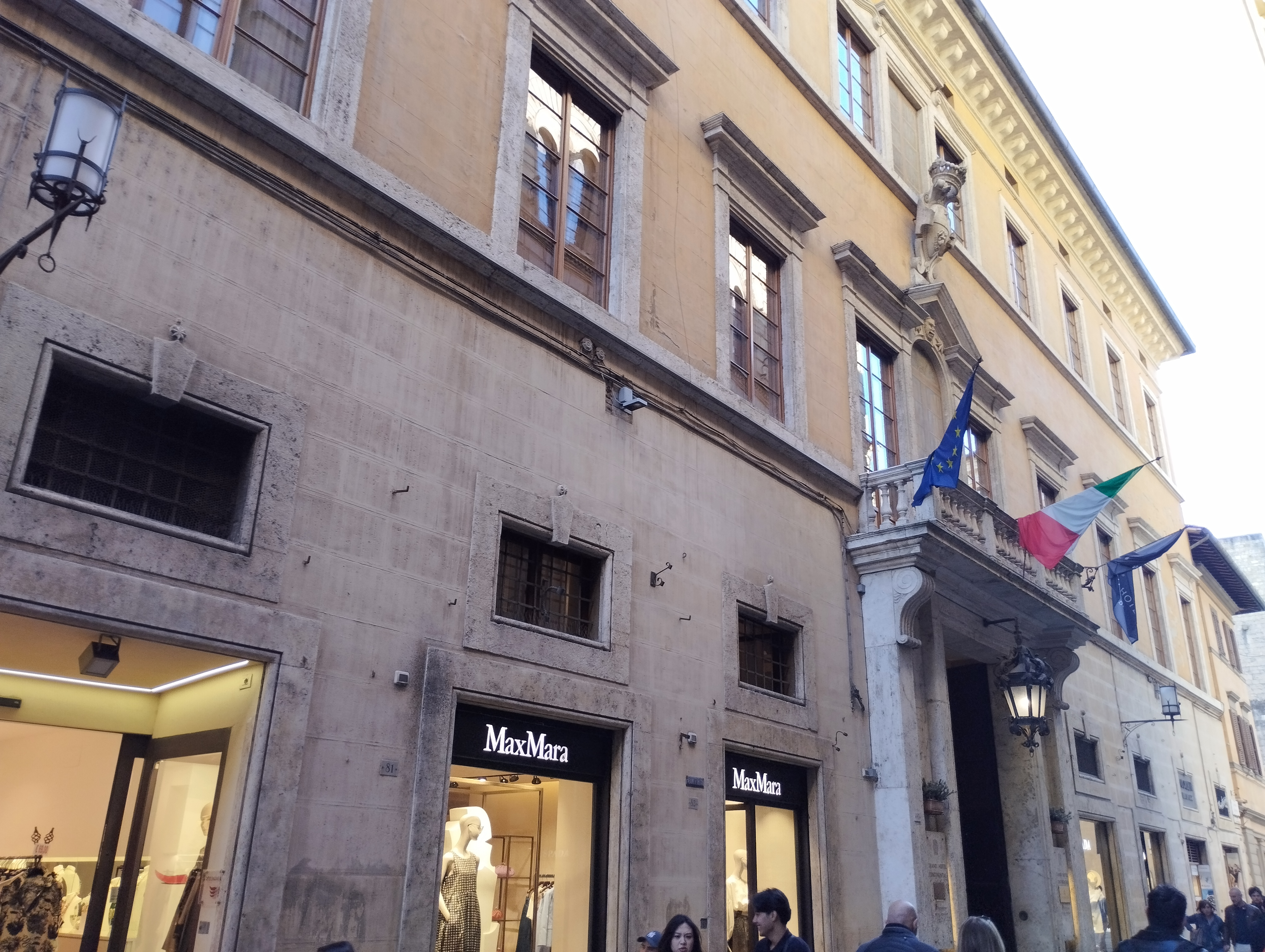
Palazzo Gori Pannilini

The Palazzo Gori Pannilini is a renaissance-style, located on via Banchi di sopra in the city of Siena, region of Tuscany, Italy.

== History ==
The palace was erected upon a pre-existing structure in 1501. It originally belonged to the Montanini, then Aringhieri, then Paolo Salvetti in 1522 who refurbished the palace using old designs by Giovanni Fontana.

During the early 20th century the palace became the Hotel Continentale or Continental. Now owned by the state, it is decorated inside with frescoes of quadrature by Antonio Colli for the ballroom, and the private rooms with scenes of Gerusalemme Liberata painted by Giovanni Battista Marchetti. A fresco depicting San Cristoforo was painted in the 15th century.
