= Museo d'Arte di Chianciano Terme =

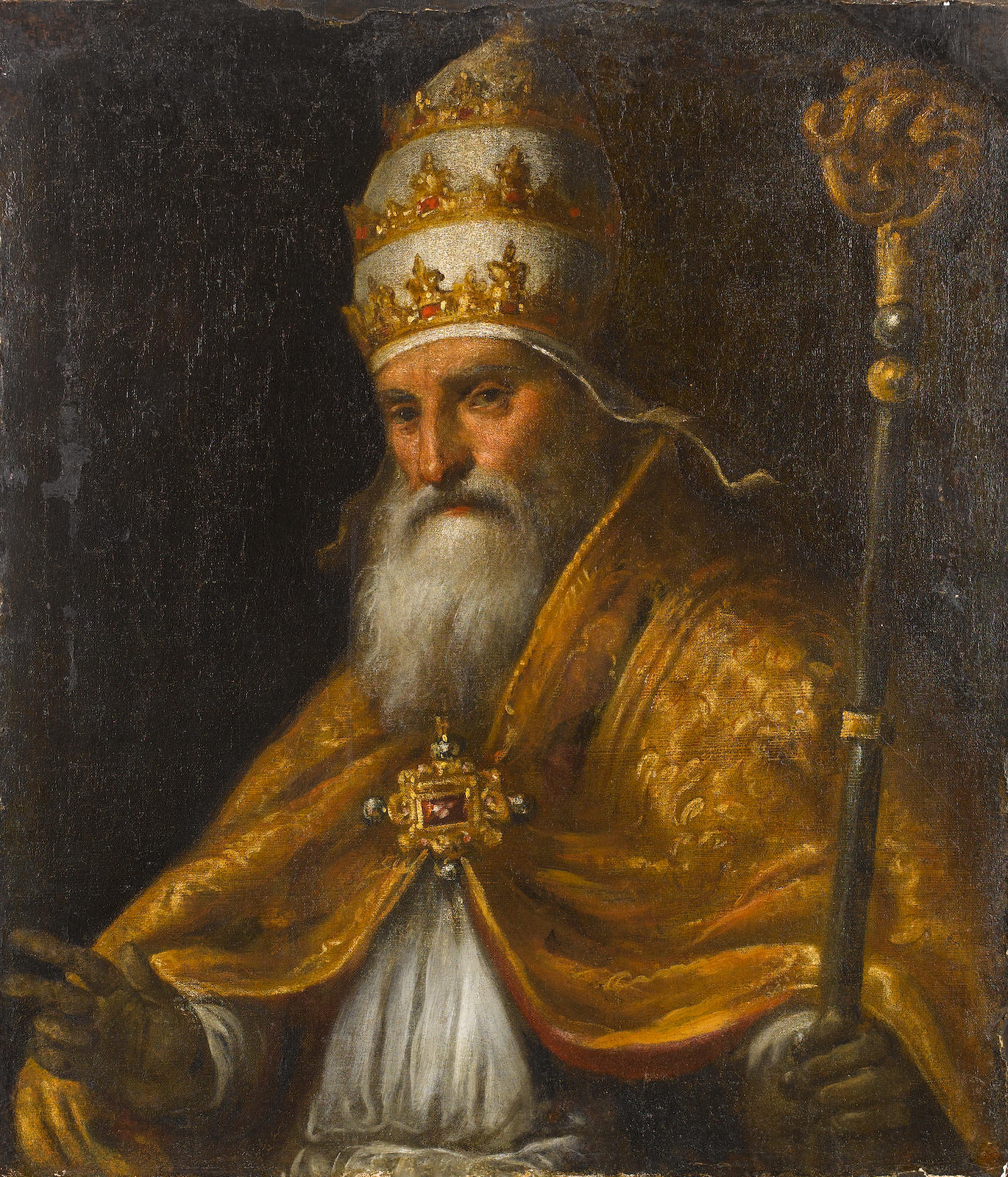
- Pius V by Palma il Giovane

- Location within Tuscany
- Established: 2009
- Location: Viale della Libertà 280, Chianciano Terme, Tuscany, Italy
- Coordinates: 43.0502°N 11.8201°E
- Type: art museum
- Collection size: 1000
- Owner: Roberto Gagliardi
- Website: museodarte.org

The Museo d'Arte di Chianciano Terme is a private art museum in Chianciano Terme, in Tuscany in central Italy. Its collections range from contemporary to Asian art. The museum was founded Roberto Gagliardi in 2009. It houses about 1000 works and occupies 3000 m^{2} in a former hotel building. It hosts the Biennale di Chianciano. The museum was inaugurated on 29 August 2009; the opening date for the museum is 15 June 2016.

== Collection ==
The collection of the museum has five sections: Asian art; contemporary art, with works by Salvador Dalí, Caroline Leeds, Damien Hirst, Albert Louden, Mario Schifano and Frances Turner; drawings, with work by Luca Giordano, Guercino, Magritte, Munch, Tiepolo and Veronese; etchings, including works by Dürer, Goya, Piranesi and Rembrandt; and a historical section containing portraits and an icon given by Pope Pius XII to Princess Margaret in 1949.

== Biennale ==
The Biennale di Chianciano is an exhibition held every two years at the museum. It was first held in 2009.

The fourth edition of the exhibition was held from 5 – 13 September 2015. Works by about 100 artists were shown in the museum, and parts of the permanent collection of the museum were displayed in other parts of the town.
