= Collegiate church of St. John the Baptist (Chianciano Terme) =

Coordinates: 43°03′33″N 11°50′00″E

The Collegiate Church of St. John the Baptist (Italian: La Collegiata di San Giovanni Battista) is a church in Chianciano Terme, Province of Siena, Italy.

== History ==
The church was built in 1229 within the village walls, near Porta San Giovanni, the main gateway, over an Etruscan hexagonal temple that had been converted to a temple of the god Janus in Roman times. During the restoration of the presbytery in 1809, two-floor levels with bricks arranged in a herringbone pattern were discovered, related to earlier phases of the building, probably to the oldest ones. The interior was renovated in neoclassical style between 1813 and 1817 by Luigi De Vegni; further changes were made in 1957.

== Description ==
The style of the building shows transitional features between Romanesque architecture and Gothic, especially in the facade. On the stone gabled facade the portal is strongly splayed, with bundled half-columns concluded by capitals with plant motifs. Two central twisted half-columns support an arch with the same decorative motif. On the tympanum stands a marble statue of St. John the Baptist datable to the 14th century.

Inside, a single nave ends with a dome, on either side of which are two side chapels. To the right of the entrance portal a sarcophagus with an Etruscan-Roman inscription reused in 1503 to preserve the ashes of Blessed Paolo Salimbeni is walled. In the right chapel, dedicated to the Blessed Sacrament, the following works are placed: on the right a 16th century fresco with the Nativity attributed by some to the Sienese painter Francesco Rustici known as Rustichino, on the altar a reliquary of the Holy Cross in gilded wood from the 18th century and in front of it a transparent urn contains the wooden sculpture of the Dead Christ by Giuseppe Paleari (1783). On the main altar is a painted wooden crucifix from the 14th century. The chapel to the left, called the Baptistery Chapel, contains the circular travertine baptismal font from the ancient baptistery and a fresco depicting the Madonna and Child known as the Madonna del Castagnolo by Bartolo di Fredi, both 14th-century works.

On the choir loft in the counterfacade is the pipe organ, built in 1771 by Ignazio Muschietti by reusing some sixteenth century phonic material; in 1967 it was enlarged by the Tamburini firm and equipped with a second electrically transmitted console.

== Bibliography ==
- Giordano Giustarini and Cesare Mancini, "Repertorio degli organi storici", in :Un così bello e nobile istrumento: Siena e l'arte degli organi (Siena: Protagon, 2008) ISBN 978-88-8024-240-6
- Maria Gabriella Capece, Chianciano Terme (Firenze: Franco Cantini Editore, 1997) ISBN 88-8030-100-4
