= Oratorio dei Crociferi, Venice =

Oratory in Venice, Italy

Coordinates: 45°26′35.16″N 12°20′18.28″E

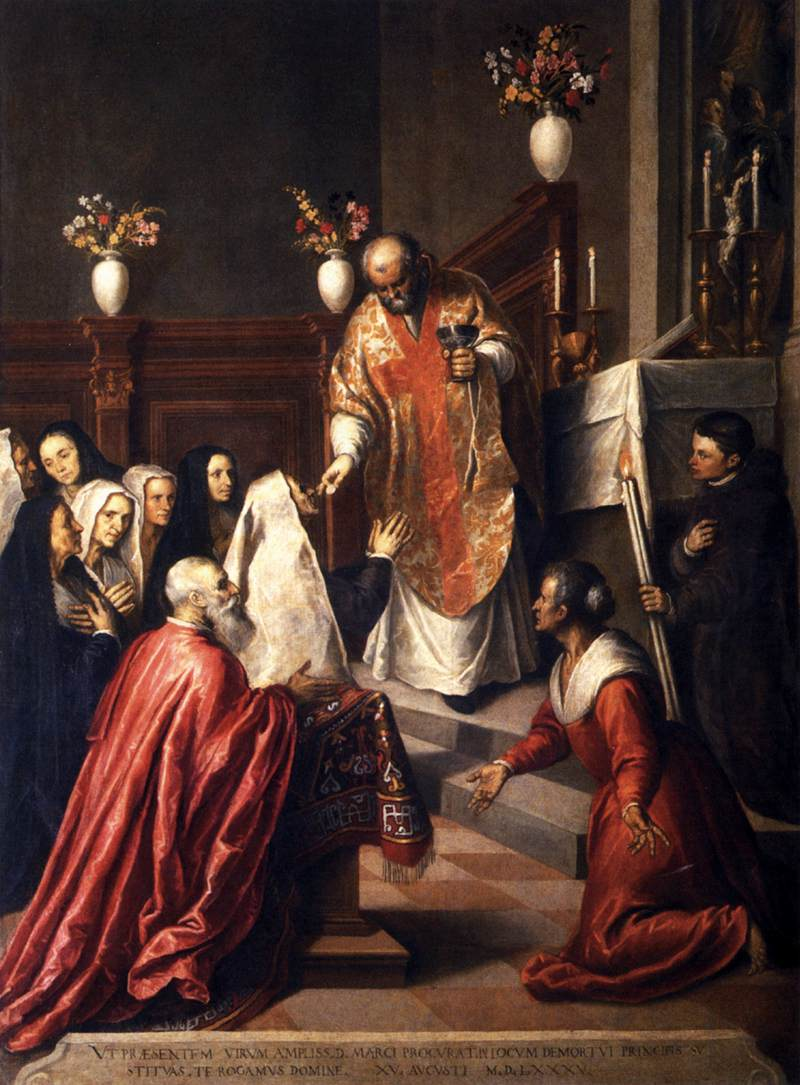
Pasquale Cicogna hears mass at the Oratory

The Oratorio dei Crociferi (Oratory of the Cross Bearers) is a small Roman Catholic oratory, or chapel, found across from the church of the Gesuiti in the sestiere of Cannaregio in Venice, Italy.

== History ==
The oratory was part of a convent found by the Order of the Crociferi, a twelfth century order dedicated to ministering to soldiers and pilgrims participating in the crusades or travels to the Holy Land. They had been patronized by Doge Renier Zen, who endowed them with a large patrimony. By the 1300s, it had become a hospital. The complex here had become by the 15th century a hospice for poor women.

The oratory was decorated with eight canvases depicting scenes from the Order of the Crociferi (1583-1592) by Palma il Giovane. The ceiling has a painting on wood of the Assumption of the Virgin with Angelic Musicians. A hospice at the site still remains adjacent to site. Relative to the elaborate Gesuiti facade, the oratory is plain entrance flanked by a house with four tall chimneys. This oratory is owned by the Instituzioni di Ricovero e di Educazione (IRE); entry is by reservation only. The site underwent restoration in 1982-1984.

== Gallery of Palma paintings ==
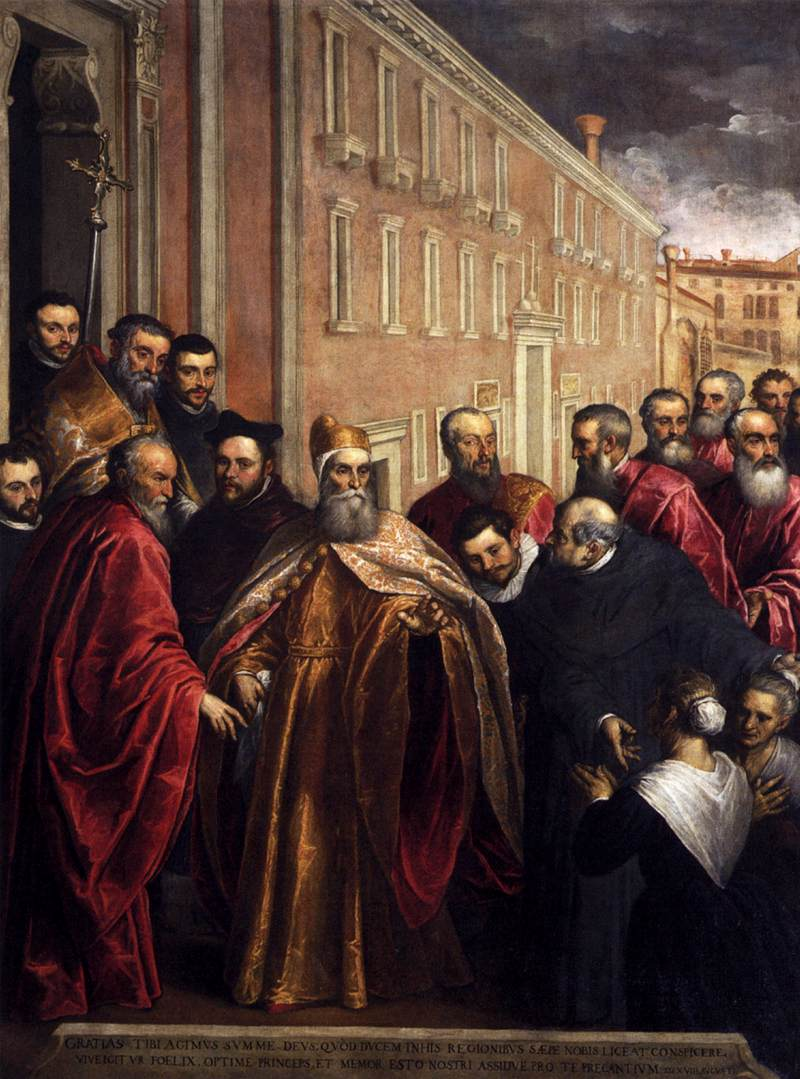
Pasquale Cicogna visit Hospital of the Oratory

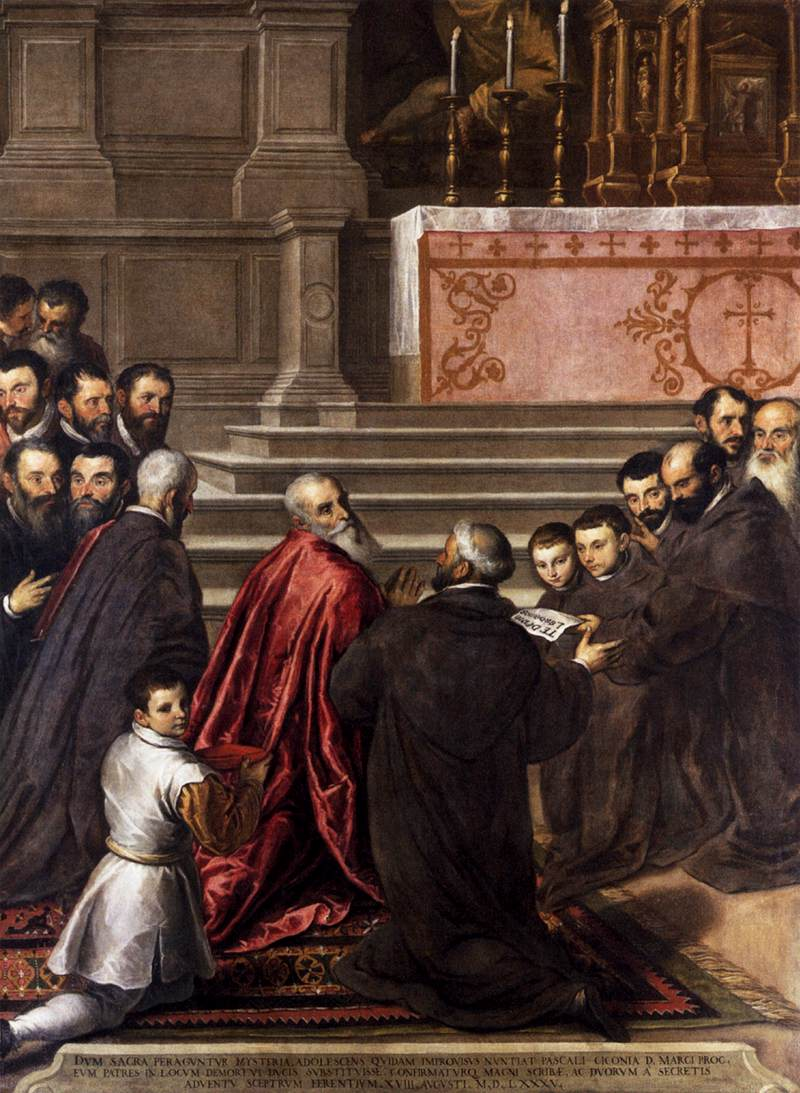
Pasquale Cicogna hears in the Oratory of his election to Doge

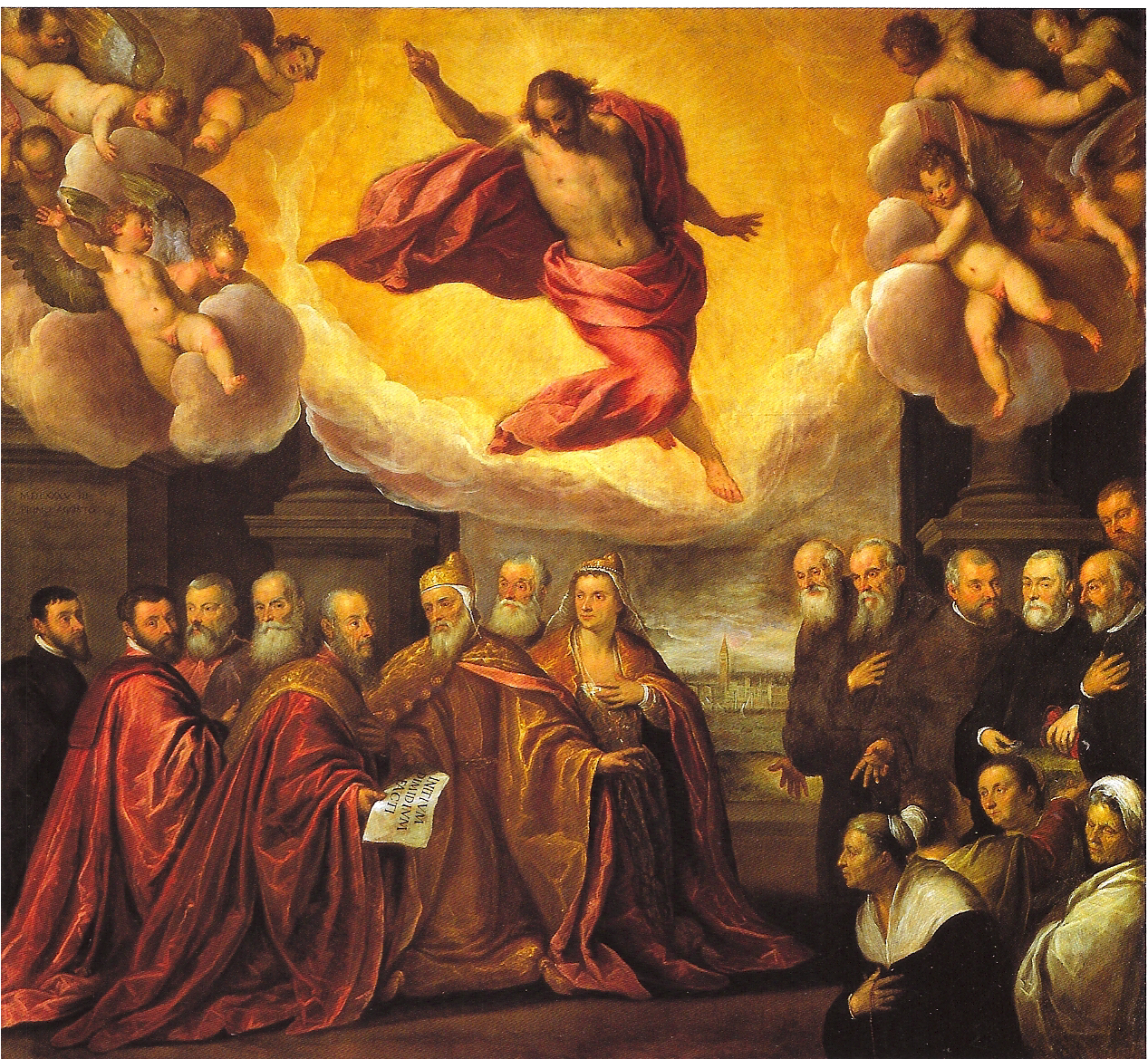
Pasquale Cicogna endows the oratory.
