= Church of Saint Mary of the Rose (Chianciano Terme) =

Santa Maria della Rosa
- Chiesa di Santa Maria della Rosa (Italian)
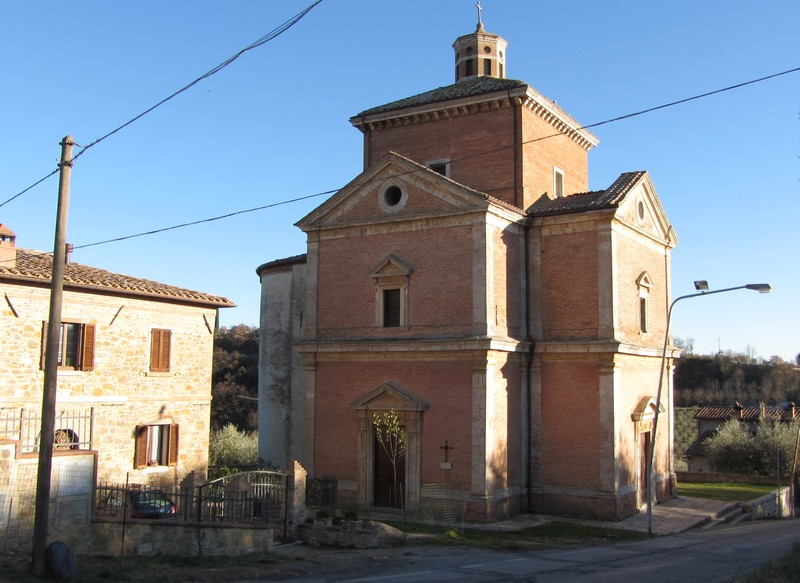
- Church of Saint Mary of the Rose
- Santa Maria della Rosa
- 43°03′24″N 11°49′59″E
- Location: Chianciano Terme, Tuscany
- Country: Italy
- Denomination: Roman Catholic
- Tradition: Roman Rite

Architecture
- Architectural type: Church

Administration
- Archdiocese: Archdiocese of Siena-Colle di Val d'Elsa-Montalcino

Saint Mary of the Rose (Italian:Santa Maria della Rosa) is a Renaissance-style, Roman Catholic church located in Chianciano Terme, Province of Siena, Italy.

== History ==
According to popular tradition, the church was built at the initiative of the Chianciano farmers who, feeling unwelcome in the Collegiate Church by the villagers, decided to build a more impressive structure. The present church was built at the site which had contained the 14th-century church of Santa Maria in Carcere or delle Nevi (built in 1346). The present The church was designed by the architect Baldassarre Lanci from Urbino, who had been working for the Grand Dukes of Tuscany since 1557. It was erected between 1585 and 1599.

== Description ==
The church has a Greek-cross layout with a semicircular apse. The arms of the church join under the square tiburium forming a dome surmounted by a polygonal lantern. Architectural and decorative elements in travertine marble stand out from the brickwork.

The dome, also called a "false dome," is a work of Leonardo De Vegni from 1766 and is divided by eight pairs of pillars framing four niches with statues of saints and four windows. The interior of the dome was painted by the Sienese painter Giovan Battista Marchetti and later decorated with stucco. The interior contains a fresco attributed to an unknown Sienese painter depicting the Madonna handing a white rose to baby Jesus between St. John the Baptist and St. Bartholomew, protectors of Chianciano, painted between 1370 and 1400. This fresco gave the church its name. The fresco comes from the suppressed church of the Madonna delle Nevi, once located in Pietriccia, in the so-called prisons quarter (Italian: contrada delle carceri). Another fresco, the so-called Madonna of the prisons (Italian: Madonna delle carceri), is a 14th-century Sienese work.

== Bibliography ==
- Maria Gabriella Capece, Chianciano Terme, Florence, Franco Cantini Editore, 1997, pp. 48–50.
- Parrocchie.it - Chiese di Chianciano
