= John Gagliardi (disambiguation) =

John Gagliardi is the name of:

- John Gagliardi (1926–2018), American college football coach
- John Gagliardi (Australian), businessman, public speaker, political lobbyist, founder of the Australian Christian Lobby (ACL)
- John Gagliardi (lacrosse) (born 1974), American lacrosse player
