= Chianciano Terme =

- Comune
- Comune di Chianciano Terme
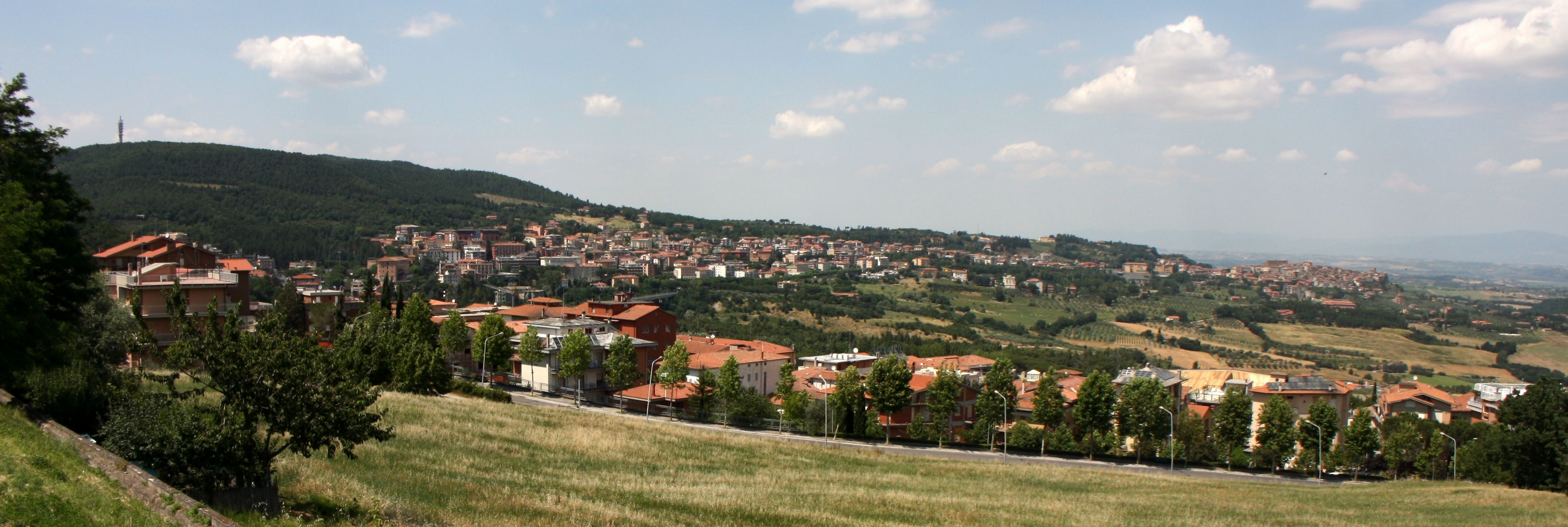

- Coat of arms

- Location within Italy Location within Tuscany
- Coordinates: 43°4′N 11°50′E
- Country: Italy
- Region: Tuscany
- Province: Siena (SI)

Government
  - Mayor: Andrea Marchetti

Area
  - Total: 36.58 km^{2} (14.12 sq mi)
- Elevation: 475 m (1,558 ft)

Population (30 June 2017)
  - Total: 7,072
  - Density: 193.3/km^{2} (500.7/sq mi)
- Demonym: Chiancianesi
- Time zone: UTC+1 (CET)
  - Summer (DST): UTC+2 (CEST)
- Postal code: 53042
- Dialing code: 0578
- Patron saint: St. John the Baptist
- Saint day: June 24
- Website: Official website

Chianciano Terme is a comune (municipality) in the Province of Siena in the Italian region Tuscany, located about 90 kilometres (56 mi) southeast of Florence and about 50 kilometres (31 mi) southeast of Siena. It is located between the Valdichiana and the Val d'Orcia.

Chianciano Terme borders the following municipalities: Chiusi, Montepulciano, Pienza, Sarteano.

== History ==
Chianciano Terme history dates to the 5th century BC when the Etruscans built a temple dedicated to the god of Good Health, close to the Silene springs where the newer quarter of Chianciano (the Terme section) stands today.

The curative power of Chianciano's water became widespread during Roman times, as Horace visited the area on the advice of his physician during the 1st century BC. Luxurious Roman villas were built in the area near the thermal baths.

In 1993 bathhouse columns and an enormous tile-paved swimming pool were excavated as part of a major spa complex unlike anything else ever found in the Siena region and one of the largest in Italy, and consistent with Horace's description.

There is little archaeological evidence of much activity during the Middle Ages, but, by the 12th and 13th centuries, Chianciano belonged to the Manenti Counts, Lords of Sarteano. Its position close to the Via Francigena (the medieval main connection from Rome to France) fostered its development, and Chianciano reached a degree of judicial autonomy by 1287 when it established its own statutes.

In the 14th century, the city states of Orvieto and Siena contended for it, with Siena being the ultimate victor.

The first decades of the 20th century saw the area around the springs (the Terme section) draw the attention of developers. Between 1920 and 1930 neoclassical establishments with Pompeian-style bowers were built, then destroyed in 1940 when the Fascist-controlled state took possession. While under state control, a new town plan was designed by architects Loreti and Marchi, who also designed some spas in the Acqua Santa Park. The town plan was adjusted by the Town Technical Office of Chianciano in 1958 and passed in 1961.

== Main sights ==
Present day Chianciano Terme has two distinct areas. Chianciano Vecchia (Ancient Chianciano) is located atop a small hill. The Porta Rivellini, with its elegant Renaissance structure, is the main gateway into the town at the end of the Via Dante. In contrast to this is the modern quarter, the Terme, whose nucleus has grown around the thermal springs and stretches northward in a crescent shape along the Vale della Libertà towards the older city.

The Church of the Immaculate Conception (Chianciano), restored in 1588 after the Florentine conquest of Siena, once housed the paintings Annunciation by Niccolò Betti, Holy Family by Galgano Perpignani, and a fresco of Madonna of the Peace attributed to Luca Signorelli. These works are currently all in the museum of the Collegiate church of St. John the Baptist (Chianciano Terme), a Romanesque-Gothic building with a notable portal. It houses a Holy Scene fresco (16th century), a 14th-century crucifix, and a wooden Dead Christ by Giuseppe Paleari (1783). The Church of Saint Mary of the Rose (Chianciano Terme) takes its name from a fresco portraying the Virgin giving a Rose to the Child, the work of a 15th-century Sienese master. Also from a Sienese artist is the Madonna delle Carceri (14th century).

Today, the Terme section is considered among the finest health resorts in Italy with its parks, numerous hotels and especially its therapeutic water that is reputed to cleanse the liver via an increase in the production and excretion of liver bile. Among the more notable spas are Acqua Santa, Acqua Fucoli, Acqua Sillene, Acqua Santissima (which also advertises itself as a spa for those with respiratory problems), and Acqua Sant'Elena (which advertises that the calcic-alkaline bicarbonate in its water can treat kidney and urinary tract problems).

== Museums and other attractions ==
- The Chianciano Museum of Art is an interesting attraction, with a large collection of contemporary and ancient art, including many pieces of historical interest. It has been praised by art journals and newspapers around the world, including the New York Times.
- Museo della collegiata (Collegiate museum)
- Archaeological Civic Museum of Chianciano Terme
- Villa La Foce, an estate and gardens open to the public

== International relations ==
=== Twin towns – Sister cities ===
Chianciano Terme is twinned with:

- Mariánské Lázně, Czech Republic

== Demographic evolution ==
Historical population

Year	Pop.	±%
1861	2,419	—
1871	2,526	+4.4%
1881	2,626	+4.0%
1901	2,886	+9.9%
1911	2,987	+3.5%

Year	Pop.	±%
1921	3,079	+3.1%
1931	3,438	+11.7%
1936	3,677	+7.0%
1951	4,548	+23.7%
1961	5,489	+20.7%

Year	Pop.	±%
1971	6,788	+23.7%
1981	7,285	+7.3%
1991	7,445	+2.2%
2001	6,955	−6.6%

Source: Data from ISTAT

== Gallery ==
Chianciano Terme

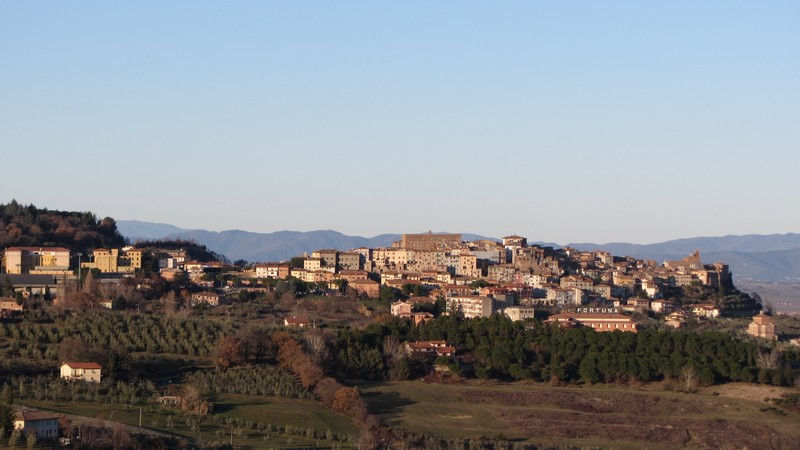
The old town

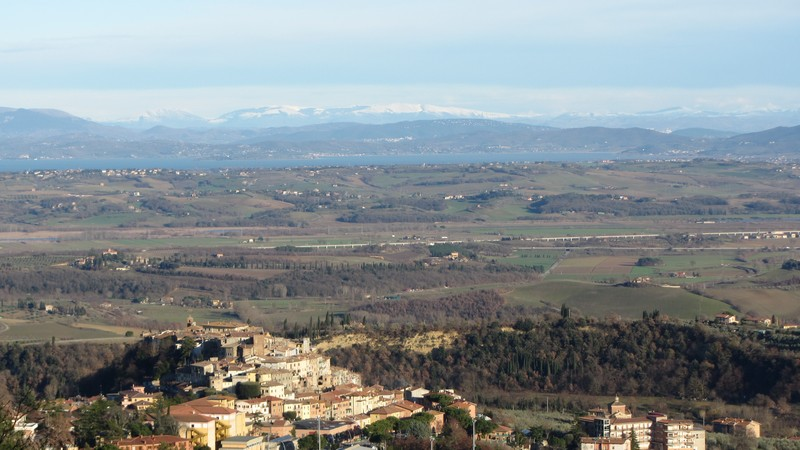
View

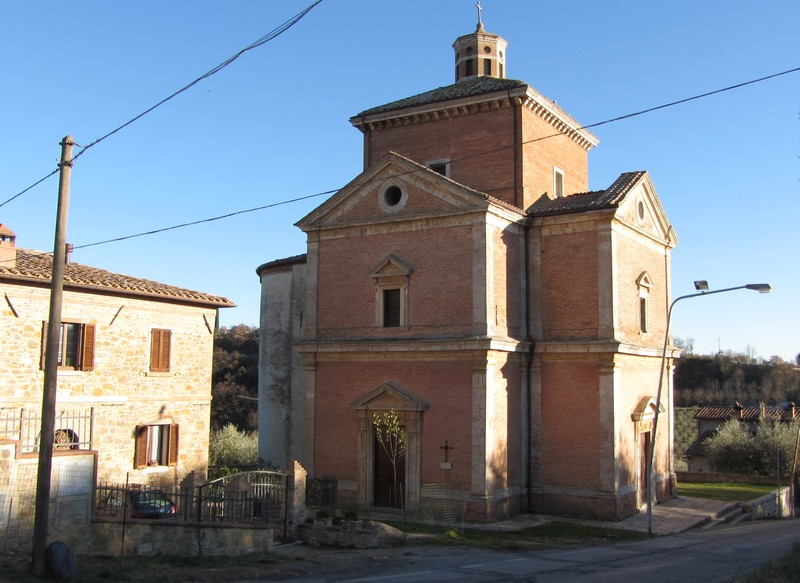
Chiesa della Madonna della Rosa (Chianciano Terme)

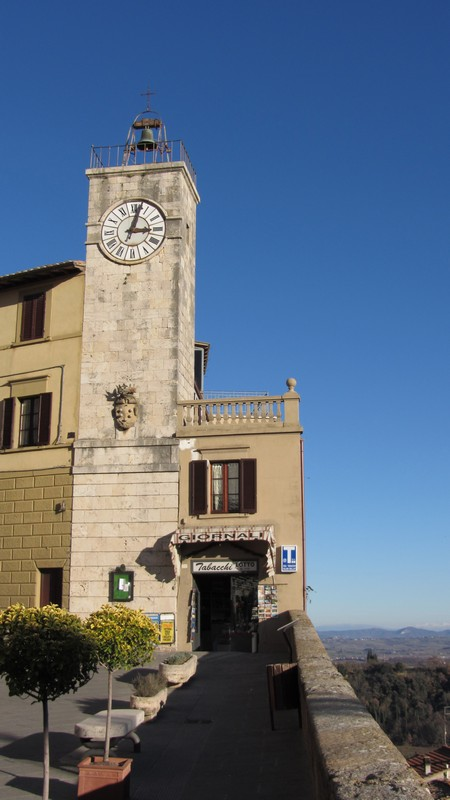
The old tower

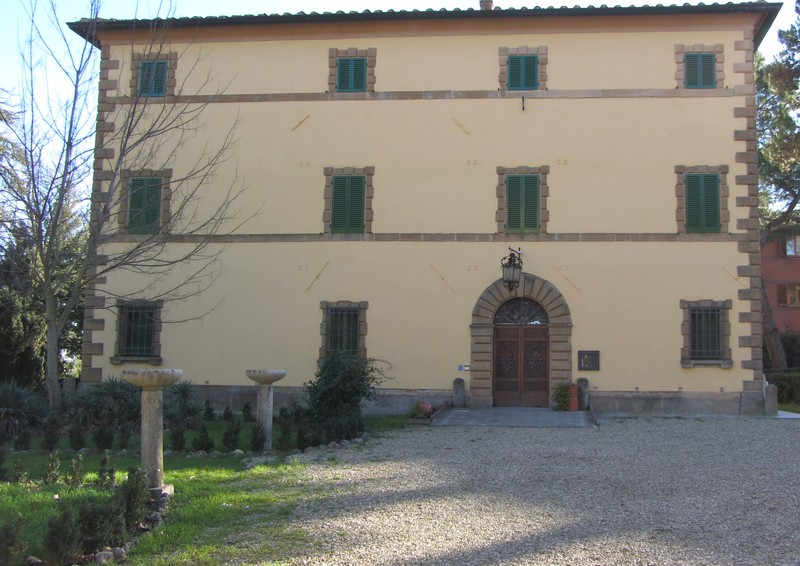
Villa Simoneschi
