= Roberto Gagliardi =

Italian-born art dealer based in London

Roberto Gagliardi is an Italian furniture importer and art dealer. He has an art gallery in London and through it organised a temporary exhibition, the "London Art Biennale", in Chelsea Old Town Hall in 2013. His art collection is housed in the Museo d'Arte di Chianciano Terme in Chianciano Terme, in Tuscany in central Italy; which since 2009 has organised the Biennale di Chianciano in the town.

== Life ==
For many years Gagliardi sold imported Italian furniture in London. In 1978 he started the Gagliardi Gallery on the Kings Road in Chelsea; and through it organised the "London Art Biennale" in 2013. Wanting to start an art museum, he chose Chianciano Terme in Italy; he bought 10 vacant shops in the town to be used for the Chianciano Expo.

In 2021 he was accused by the council of Chianciano Terme of defamation for criticisms against the mayor.

In 2025, he offered to host in a suite in his art museum, a homeless Senegalese boy immigrant who was sleeping in a tree during the winter.

=== Community engagement ===
In May 2025, Gagliardi launched a civic-participation blog called Chianciano idee, aimed at gathering proposals from residents and local groups to support cultural, social, and tourism initiatives in Chianciano Terme. According to reporting by La Nazione, the Museo d’Arte di Chianciano offered support for ideas that could be realized as events or initiatives, including a €500 award for the proposer, advertising pages in national newspapers, 1,000 radio spots on Radio Subasio, and targeted digital promotion.
