= Galgano Perpignani =

Italian painter

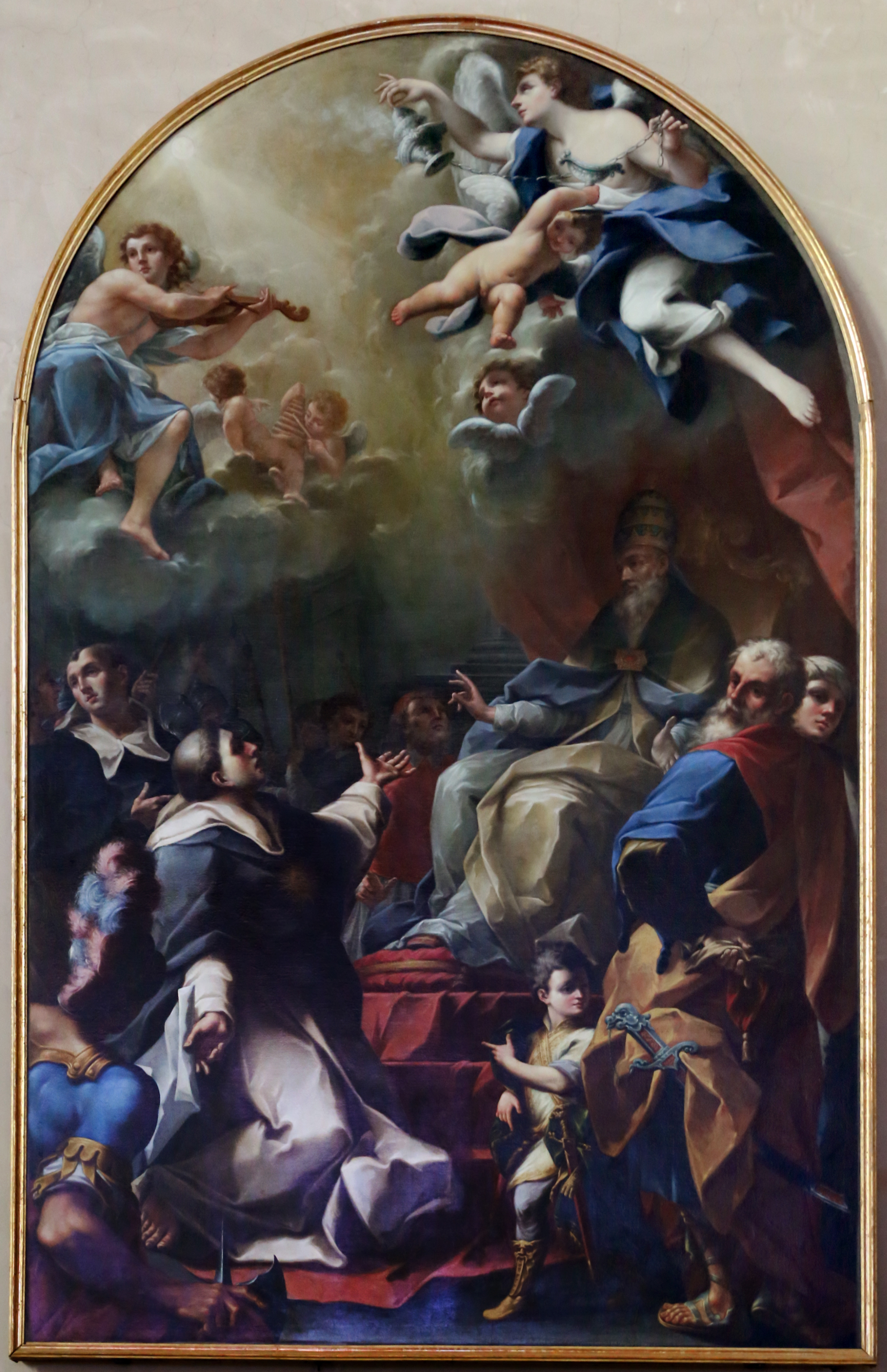
Thomas Aquinas Altarpiece, in San Domenico (Siena)

Galgano Perpignani (1694 – 1770) was an Italian painter, active in painted sacred and mythologic subjects.

He studied in Bologna under Giovanni Gioseffo dal Sole. He was an honorary member of the Accademia Clementina, and died in Bologna. He also worked in his native Siena.

Among his works is an altarpiece of the Ecstasy of Santa Rita da Cascia (1734), painted for the church of San Giacomo Maggiore in Bologna. He also painted a Carlo Borromeo and Luigi Gonzaga and a Vision of Saint Antony for the Oratory of Saint Anthony of Padua, located in Siena.
