= List of museums with Egyptian mummies in their collections =

The following is a list of museums with reasonably complete mummies from Egypt in their collections, as well as information on them when applicable. This includes the Ptolemaic and Roman periods.

== Africa ==
=== Egypt ===
- Alexandria National Museum
- Antiquities Museum in the Bibliotheca Alexandrina
- Cairo International Airport Museum
- Egyptian Museum
- Egypt's Capitals Museum
- Graeco-Roman Museum
- Grand Egyptian Museum
- Hurghada Museum
- Imhotep Museum
- Kafr El Sheikh Museum
- Kasr al-Ainy Museum
- Luxor Museum
- Aswan Museum
- Mummification Museum
- National Museum of Egyptian Civilization
- Nubian Museum
- Sharm El Sheikh Museum

=== South Africa ===
- Albany Museum, South Africa
- Ditsong National Museum of Cultural History

== Asia ==
=== India ===
- Indian National Museum- Kolkata
- Albert Hall Museum-Tutu
- Baroda Museum & Picture Gallery
- Telangana State Archaeology Museum

=== Israel ===
- Pontifical Biblical Institute Museum – Iret-hor-iru

== Europe ==
=== Belgium ===
- Art & History Museum, Brussels
- Curtius Museum

=== Croatia ===
- Archaeological Museum in Zagreb

=== Czech Republic ===
- Buchlov Castle-Nefersobek
- Hrdlička Museum of Anthropology
- Kynžvart Castle-Qenamūn
- Moravská Třebová City Museum- Hereret
- Náprstek Museum
- National Museum (Prague)
- Regional museum in Olomouc

=== Denmark ===
- National Museum of Denmark

=== Estonia ===
- University of Tartu Art Museum

=== France ===
- Georges Labit Museum
- Musée de Boulogne-sur-Mer
- Musée de Guéret
- Musée de Picardie-Setjaïmengaou
- Musée de Tessé
- Musée des Beaux-Arts et d'Archéologie de Besançon
- Musée des Confluences
- Musée d'histoire locale de Rueil-Malmaison 5 year old Ta-Iset.

=== Germany ===
- Ägyptisches Museum der Universität Leipzig
- Ägyptisches Museum und Papyrussammlung
- Naturmuseum Senckenberg
- Staatliche Sammlung für Ägyptische Kunst
- Roemer- und Pelizaeus-Museum Hildesheim

=== Greece ===
- National Archaeological Museum, Athens

=== Hungary ===
- Museum of Fine Arts, Budapest, four mummies – the priestess Hortesnakht of Akhmim, the lady Rer of Saqqara, an unidentified man from the 4th or 3rd century BCE (known as "the mummy from Szombathely" after the location of the previous collection he was part of) and a man from the 2nd century BCE (known as "the unwrapped mummy" as he was already unwrapped when the museum received him).
- Déri Museum, Debrecen, two mummies – the priest Hor and a middle-aged man who lived during the 18th Dynasty.
- Pannonia Reformata Museum, Pápa, one mummy – a middle-aged man buried in a coffin usurped from Hori, a priest who lived during the 20th Dynasty.

=== Ireland ===
- Anatomy Museum, Trinity College Dublin – possibly Ankh'hap
- National Museum of Ireland – Tentdinebu

=== Italy ===
- Archaeological Museum of Saint Peter's Baptistery, Asti
- City Museum of Biella
- The Archaeological Civic Museum (MCA) of Bologna – Usai and others
- Civic Museum of Ligurian Archaeology, Genoa
- Civico museo archeologico di Bergamo – Ankhekhonsu
- Egyptian Museum (Milan)
- Museo dell'Accademia Etrusca
- Museo Egizio – Kha and Merit
- Museo Missionario Etnografico Francescano
- Museum of Anthropology and Ethnography at the University of Turin
- Museum of Pathological Anatomy of Pisa
- National Archaeological Museum, Florence
- National Archaeological Museum, Naples
- National Archaeological Museum of Parma
- Visconti Castle (Pavia)
- Stibbert Museum

=== Lithuania ===
- M. K. Čiurlionis National Art Museum
- Museum of Antiquities in Vilnius

=== Monaco ===
- Museum of Prehistoric Anthropology

=== Netherlands ===
- Groninger Museum
- Rijksmuseum van Oudheden

=== Portugal ===
- Museu Arqueológico do Carmo
- Museu de História Natural da Faculdade de Ciências da Universidade do Porto
- National Museum of Archaeology, Lisbon

=== Romania ===
- Franz Binder Museum of Universal Ethnography
- National Museum of Transylvanian History

=== Slovakia ===
- Betliar Manor House-Nebey
- Gemer-Malohont Museum, Rimavská Sobota -Tasheritnetiakh
- Slovak National Museum

=== Sweden ===
- Medelhavsmuseet

=== Switzerland ===
- Antikenmuseum Basel und Sammlung Ludwig
- Naturhistorisches Museum, Basel
- Musée d'Art et d'Histoire (Geneva)

=== United Kingdom ===
- Ashmolean Museum, Oxford
- Birmingham Museum and Art Gallery
- Blackburn Museum and Art Gallery
- Bolton Museum
- Bournemouth Natural Science Society Museum – Tahemaa
- Brighton Museum & Art Gallery
- Bristol Museum
- British Museum, London
- Burrell Collection, Glasgow
- Cliffe Castle Museum, Keighley
- Derby Museum and Art Gallery
- Durham University Oriental Museum
- Fitzwilliam Museum, Cambridge
- Garstang Museum of Archaeology
- Great North Museum: Hancock, Newcastle upon Tyne
- Hands On History Museum, Kingston upon Hull
- Haslemere Educational Museum – Pa-Er-Abu
- Horniman Museum
- Hunterian Museum and Art Gallery – Possibly Shep-en-hor
- Ipswich Museum-Ta-Hathor
- Kelvingrove Art Gallery and Museum-Nekht
- Lawrence Room Girton College, Cambridge-Hermione
- Leeds City Museum – Nesyamun
- Leicester Museum & Art Gallery – Pa-nesit-tawy, Pe-iuy, Bes-en-Mut and Ta-Bes.
- Maidstone Museum, Kent – Ta-Kush; c.700–650 BC
- Manchester Museum
- National Museum of Scotland, Edinburgh
- Norwich Castle – Ankh-Hor and Unknown.
- Perth Museum – Ta-Kr-Hb
- Pitt Rivers Museum, Oxford
- Royal Albert Memorial Museum – Shep en-Mut
- Royal Cornwall Museum – Iset-tayef-nakht
- Saffron Walden Museum
- Science Museum, London
- Swansea Museum – Hor
- Swindon Museum and Art Gallery – Hatemui
- Torquay Museum
- Towneley Hall Museum
- Ulster Museum-Takabuti
- Wellcome Collection
- Warrington Museum & Art Gallery
- Weston Park Museum, Sheffield – Nesitanebetasheru and Djedma'atiuesankh; 720–650 BCE
- World Museum, Liverpool

==== Uncertain ====
- Egypt Centre, Swansea CT scan suggests that the wrappings contain a fetus but uncertain.

== North America ==
=== Canada ===
- Redpath Museum
- Royal Ontario Museum, Toronto, Ontario – Nine total
  - Nakht – Twentieth Dynasty of Egypt
  - Nefer-Mut
  - Djedmaatesankh – 9th Century BCE
  - Antjau – 26th Dynasty of Egypt

=== United States of America ===
- Albany Institute of History and Art, Albany, New York, USA – Ankhefenmut, 21st dynasty
- Art Institute of Chicago, Chicago, Illinois
- Berkshire Museum, Pittsfield, Massachusetts – Pahat, 332 to 30 BCE
- Brooklyn Museum
- Charleston Museum, Charleston, South Carolina
- Denver Museum of Nature and Science
- Detroit Institute of Arts, Detroit, Michigan
- Institute for the Study of Ancient Cultures
- Field Museum, Chicago, Illinois
- Frances Lehman Loeb Art Center-Shepen-Min
- Houston Museum of Natural Science, Houston, Texas
- Johns Hopkins University Archaeological Museum
- Joseph Moore Museum, Richmond, Indiana
- Louisiana Art and Science Museum, Baton Rouge, Louisiana
- Kalamazoo Valley Museum, Kalamazoo, Michigan – Tjenet-nefer
- Kelsey Museum of Archaeology, University of Michigan, Ann Arbor, Michigan
- Grand Rapids Public Museum, Grand Rapids, Michigan
- Metropolitan Museum of Art, New York City, New York
- Minneapolis Institute of Art, Minneapolis, Minnesota
- Michael C. Carlos Museum
- Reading Public Museum, West Reading, Pennsylvania – Nefrina
- Rhode Island School of Design Museum-Nesmin
- Rosicrucian Egyptian Museum
- Science Museum of Minnesota
- Smithsonian National Museum of Natural History, Washington, DC
- Spurlock Museum
- Tennessee State Museum
- Vanderbilt Museum
- Virginia Museum of Fine Arts-Tjeby
- Wayne County Historical Museum, Richmond, Indiana

== Oceania ==
=== Australia ===
- Australian Museum
- Chau Chak Wing Museum
- Museum of Old and New Art-Pausiris
- Nicholson Museum
- South Australian Museum
- Tasmanian Museum and Art Gallery

=== New Zealand ===
- Auckland War Memorial Museum, Auckland – Souser-iret-binet (850–575 BCE) and an unnamed boy aged 5–6 years (4th century BCE)
- Canterbury Museum, Christchurch – Tash Pen Khonsu, dated to 185 BCE
- Tūhura Otago Museum, Dunedin
- Te Papa, Wellington – Mehit-em-Wesekht, c. 300 BCE

== South America ==
=== Argentina ===
- La Plata Museum

=== Brazil ===
- Egyptian and Rosicrucian Museum – Tothmea

== See also ==
- List of museums of Egyptian antiquities
- Gordon Museum of Pathology home to Alan Billis who in 2011 was mummified in an Egyptian manner.
- Museum of Us home to a man mummified in an Egyptian manner in 1994
