= Egyptian Museum (disambiguation) =

The Egyptian Museum is a museum of Egyptian antiquities in Cairo, Egypt.

Egyptian Museum may also refer to:

- Grand Egyptian Museum, Giza, Egypt
- National Museum of Egyptian Civilization Cairo, Egypt
- Egyptian Museum of Berlin, Germany
- Egyptian Museum of Florence, Italy
- Egyptian Museum (Milan), Italy
- Egyptian Museum of Turin (Museo Egizio), Italy
- Egypt Centre, Swansea University, UK
- Rosicrucian Egyptian Museum, San Jose, California, US
