= List of museums of Egyptian antiquities =

The following is a list of museums with major collections of Egyptian antiquities:

== Museum collections with specified number ==
=== Over 50,000 ===
1. Grand Egyptian Museum, Giza, Egypt: Over 100,000 artifacts
2. Egyptian Museum, Cairo, Egypt: Over 100,000 artifacts
3. British Museum, London, England: Over 100,000 artifacts (not including the Wendorf Collection of Egyptian and Sudanese Prehistory of six million artifacts)
4. Ägyptisches Museum, Neues Museum, Berlin, Germany: About 80,000 artifacts
5. Petrie Museum of Egyptian Archaeology, London, England: About 80,000 artifacts
6. Musée du Louvre, Paris, France: 77,404 artifacts
7. National Museum of Egyptian Civilization, Cairo, Egypt: 50,000 artifacts

=== Over 10,000 ===
1. Boston Museum of Fine Arts, Boston, Massachusetts, USA: About 45,000 artifacts
2. Kelsey Museum of Archaeology, Ann Arbor, Michigan, USA: Over 45,000 artifacts
3. Penn Museum, Philadelphia, Pennsylvania, USA: Over 42,000 artifacts
4. Ashmolean Museum, Oxford, England: About 40,000 artifacts
5. Museo Egizio, Turin, Italy: About 40,000 artifacts
6. Institute for the Study of Ancient Cultures, Chicago, Illinois, USA: About 30,000 artifacts
7. Metropolitan Museum of Art, New York City, New York, USA: About 30,000 artifacts
8. Rijksmuseum van Oudheden, Leiden, The Netherlands: Over 25,250 artifacts
9. Royal Ontario Museum, Toronto, Ontario, Canada: 25,000 artifacts
10. Hearst Museum of Anthropology, Berkeley, California, USA: Over 17,000 artifacts
11. Fitzwilliam Museum, Cambridge, England: Over 16,000 artifacts
12. World Museum, Liverpool, England: Over 16,000 artifacts
13. Manchester Museum, Manchester, England: About 16,000 artifacts
14. Egyptian Museum, Florence, Italy: Over 14,000 artifacts
15. Kunsthistorisches Museum, Vienna, Austria: Over 17,000 artifacts
16. Bolton Art Gallery, Library & Museum, Bolton, England: About 12,000 artifacts
17. Art & History Museum, Brussels, Belgium: Over 11,000 artifacts

=== Over 5,000 ===
1. Pushkin Museum of Fine Arts, Moscow, Russia: More than 8,000 artifacts
2. Staatliche Sammlung für Ägyptische Kunst, Munich, Germany: About 8,000 artifacts
3. Roemer- und Pelizaeus-Museum Hildesheim, Hildesheim, Germany: 8,000 artifacts
4. Ägyptisches Museum der Universität Leipzig, Leipzig, Saxony, Germany: About 8,000 artifacts
5. Michael C. Carlos Museum, Atlanta, Georgia, USA: 7,500 objects
6. Sharm El Sheikh Museum, Sharm El Sheikh, Egypt: 7,000 artifacts
7. Durham University Oriental Museum, Durham, England: Over 6,700 artifacts
8. National Archaeological Museum, Athens, Greece: Over 6,000 artifacts
9. National Museum in Warsaw, Warsaw, Poland: 6,000 artifacts
10. National Museum of Scotland, Edinburgh, Scotland: 6,000 artifacts
11. The Hermitage, St Petersburg, Russia: Over 5,500 artifacts
12. Birmingham Museum and Art Gallery, Birmingham, England: About 8,000 artifacts
13. Peabody Museum of Natural History, New Haven, Connecticut, USA: Over 5,000 artifacts
14. The Egypt Centre, Swansea University, Swansea, Wales: Over 5,000 artifacts
15. Kelvingrove Art Gallery and Museum, Glasgow, Scotland: 5,000 artifacts

=== Over 1,000 ===
1. Musée des Confluences, Lyon, France: Over 4,900 artifacts
2. Museum of Fine Arts, Budapest, Hungary: Over 4,000 artifacts
3. Rosicrucian Egyptian Museum, San Jose, California, USA: Over 4,000 artifacts
4. Field Museum, Chicago, Illinois, USA: Over 3,500 artifacts
5. Museo Civico Archeologico, Bologna, Italy: About 3,500 artifacts
6. Brooklyn Museum, Brooklyn, New York, USA: More than 3,000 artifacts
7. National Museum of Ireland, Dublin, Ireland: About 3,000 artifacts
8. Carnegie Museum of Natural History, Pittsburgh, Pennsylvania, USA: More than 2,500 artifacts
9. Naples National Archaeological Museum, Naples, Italy: 2,500 artifacts
10. Hunterian Museum and Art Gallery, Glasgow, Scotland: 2,300 artifacts
11. Hurghada Museum, Hurghada, Egypt: 2,000 artifacts
12. Ny Carlsberg Glyptotek, Copenhagen, Denmark: More than 1,900 artifacts
13. National Museum of Natural History, Washington, District of Columbia, USA: More than 1,900 artifacts
14. Los Angeles County Museum of Art, Los Angeles, California, USA: More than 1,600 artifacts
15. Musée des Beaux-Arts de Lyon, Lyon, France: 1,500 artifacts
16. Art Museum of the University of Memphis, Memphis, Tennessee, USA: More than 1,400 artifacts
17. Egyptian Museum of Barcelona, Barcelona, Spain: 1,260 artifacts
18. Walters Art Museum, Baltimore, Maryland, USA: More than 1,000 artifacts
19. Cleveland Museum of Art, Cleveland, Ohio, USA: More than 1,000 artifacts
20. Freer Gallery of Art, Washington, District of Columbia, USA: More than 1,000 artifacts
21. Australian Museum, Sydney, New South Wales, Australia: Over 1,000 artifacts

=== Over 100 ===
1. Prewitt–Allen Archaeological Museum, Salem, Oregon, USA: Over 900 artifacts
2. Maidstone Museum, Kent, England: over 600 artifacts
3. Leicester Museum & Art Gallery, Leicester, England: Over 400 artifacts
4. Odesa Archaeological Museum, Odesa, Ukraine: Over 400 artifacts
5. Weston Park Museum, Sheffield, England: Over 300 artifacts
6. Imhotep Museum, Saqqara, Egypt: More than 280 artifacts
7. Ulster Museum, Belfast, Northern Ireland: About 100 artifacts on display

== Other significant collections with unspecified number of artifacts ==
- Sudan National Museum, Khartoum, Sudan (3 relocated temples due to the flooding of Lake Nasser and other artifacts from the area of the third cataract)
- Abbey Museum of Art and Archaeology, Caboolture, Queensland, Australia
- Alexandria National Museum, Alexandria, Egypt
- Allard Pierson Museum, Amsterdam, Netherlands
- American Museum of Natural History, New York City, New York, USA
- Anniston Museum of Natural History, Anniston, Alabama, USA
- Antikenmuseum Basel und Sammlung Ludwig, Basel, Switzerland
- Australian National University Classics Museum, Canberra, Australian Capital Territory, Australia
- Bass Museum, Miami Beach, Florida, USA
- Bible Lands Museum, Jerusalem
- The Box, Plymouth, Devon, England
- Brighton Museum & Art Gallery, Brighton, England
- Canterbury Museum, Christchurch, New Zealand
- Chau Chak Wing Museum, University of Sydney, New South Wales, Australia
- The Children's Museum of Indianapolis, Indianapolis, Indiana, USA
- Chrysler Museum of Art, Norfolk, Virginia, USA
- Denver Museum of Nature and Science, Denver, Colorado, USA
- Egyptian Museum, Milan, Italy
- Egyptian Museum of Mississauga, Mississauga, Ontario, Canada
- Fleming Museum of Art, Burlington, Vermont, USA
- Garstang Museum of Archaeology, University of Liverpool, England
- Gulbenkian Museum, Lisbon, Portugal
- Houston Museum of Natural Science, Houston, Texas, USA
- Indian Museum, Kolkata, Kolkata, India
- Israel Museum, Jerusalem
- Iziko South African Museum, Cape Town, South Africa
- Johns Hopkins Archaeological Museum, Baltimore, Maryland
- Museum August Kestner, Hanover, Germany
- Krannert Art Museum, Champaign, Illinois, USA
- Leeds City Museum, Leeds, England
- Luxor Museum, Luxor, Egypt
- McClung Museum of Natural History and Culture, University of Tennessee, Knoxville, Tennessee, USA
- Medusa Ancient Art, Montreal, Quebec, Canada
- Milwaukee Public Museum, Milwaukee, Wisconsin, USA
- Musée d'Art et d'Histoire, Geneva, Switzerland
- Musée royal de Mariemont, Morlanwelz, Belgium
- Museum für Kunst und Gewerbe Hamburg, Hamburg, Germany
- National Archaeology Museum, Lisbon, Portugal
- Museo Gregoriano Egiziano, Vatican City
- Museum of Ancient Orient, Istanbul, Turkey
- Museum of New Zealand Te Papa Tongarewa, Wellington, New Zealand
- National Gallery of Victoria, Melbourne, Victoria, Australia
- Nelson-Atkins Museum of Art, Kansas City, Missouri, USA
- The Newark Museum of Art, Newark, New Jersey, USA
- Redpath Museum, McGill University, Montreal, Quebec, Canada
- Rhode Island School of Design Museum, Providence. Rhode Island, USA
- Robert and Frances Fullerton Museum of Art, California State University, San Bernardino, California, USA
- San Antonio Museum of Art, San Antonio, Texas, USA
- Museum of Us, San Diego, California, USA
- Harvard Museum of the Ancient Near East, Cambridge, Massachusetts, USA
- Sir John Soane's Museum, London, England
- Son of the Pharaoh, Calgary, Alberta, Canada
- South Australian Museum, North Terrace, Adelaide, South Australia
- Virginia Museum of Fine Arts, Richmond, Virginia, USA'
- Wadsworth Atheneum, Hartford, Connecticut, USA
- Western Australian Museum, Perth, Western Australia, Australia
- National Archaeological Museum (Madrid), Madrid, Spain

== Other or minor collections ==
- Albany Institute of History and Art, Albany, New York, USA
- Grand Rapids Public Museum, Grand Rapids, Michigan, USA
- Kalamazoo Valley Museum, Kalamazoo, Michigan
- Louisiana Art and Science Museum, Baton Rouge, Louisiana
- Museum of Antiquities (University of Saskatchewan), Saskatoon, Saskatchewan, Canada
- Museum of Old and New Art, Hobart, Tasmania, Australia
- Otago Museum, Dunedin, New Zealand
- Reading Public Museum, West Reading, Pennsylvania, USA
- Wayne County Historical Museum, Richmond, Indiana, USA
- Eva Klabin House Museum, Rio de Janeiro, Rio de Janeiro, Brazil: 50 artifacts
- North Carolina Museum of Art, Raleigh, North Carolina: 38 artifacts

== See also ==
- List of museums with Egyptian mummies in their collections
- List of museums in Egypt
