= Imhotep Museum =

Archaeological museum in located in the Saqqara necropolis complex

Coordinates: 29.8700°N 31.2161°E

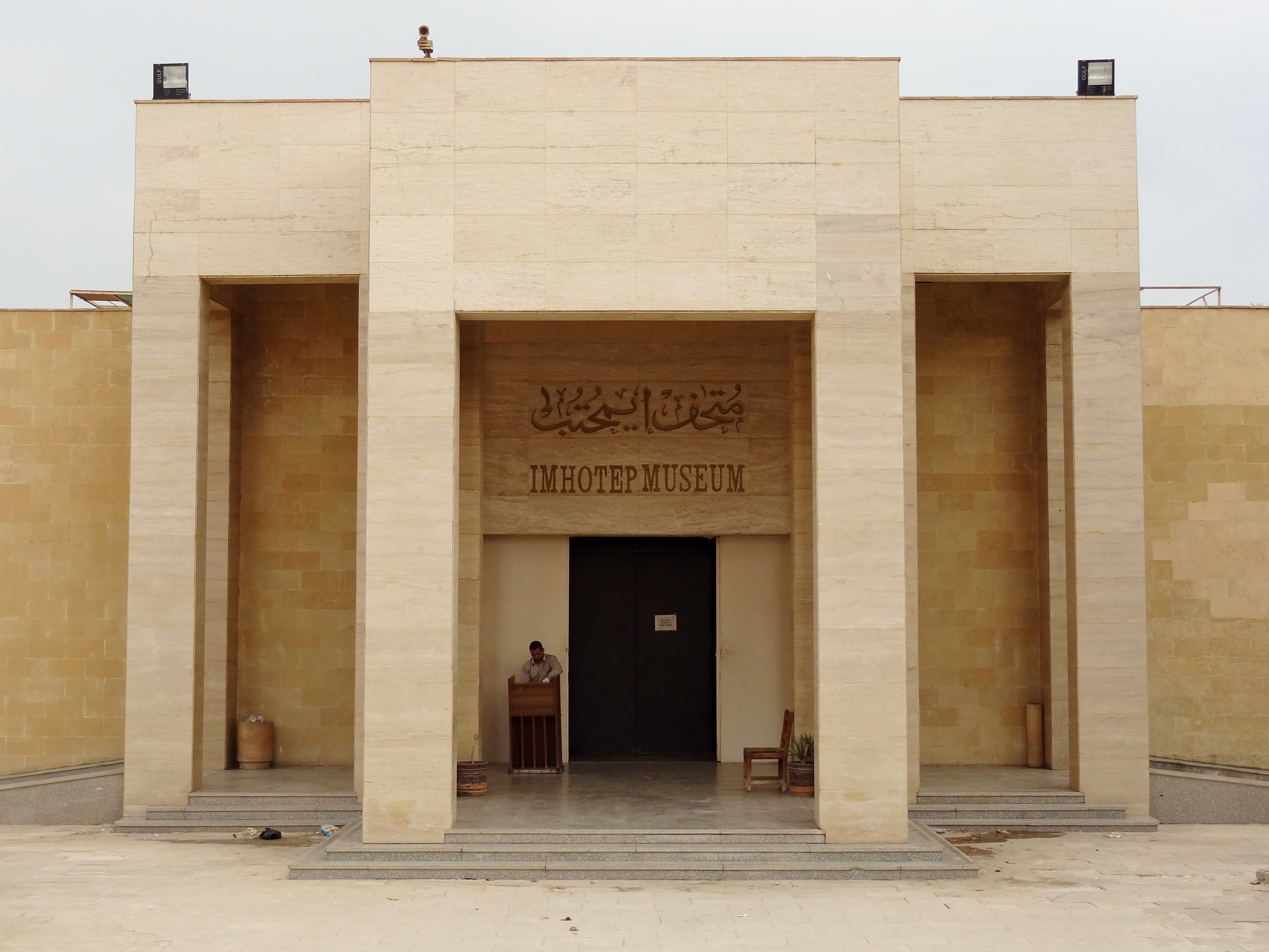
- The museum entrance
- Established: April 26, 2006
- Location: located at the foot of the Saqqara necropolis complex, near Memphis in Lower Egypt
- Type: archaeological museum

The Imhotep Museum is an archaeological museum located at the foot of the Saqqara necropolis complex, near Memphis in Lower Egypt.

== History ==
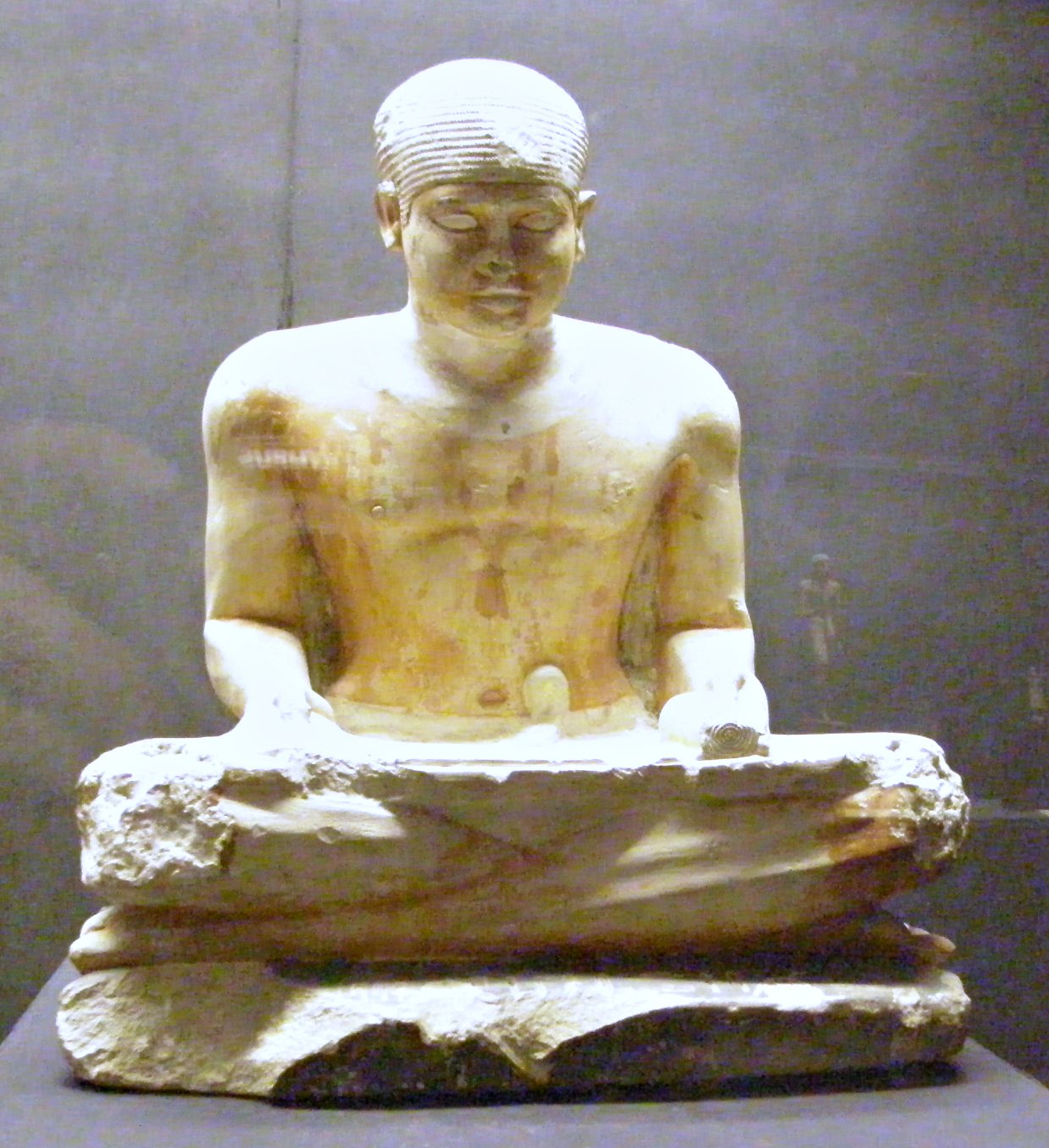
Imhotep Museum, statue of a scribe, 5th Dynasty

The museum, which was named for the ancient Egyptian architect Imhotep, was opened on April 26, 2006 by Suzanne Mubarak and Bernadette Chirac. Imhotep is credited with being the first Egyptian to build a monumental structure out of stone: Pharaoh Djoser's step pyramid located at Saqqara, which was built during the 3rd Dynasty.

Constructed as part of the strategic site management program of the Supreme Council of Antiquities, the air-conditioned Imhotep Museum provides a more secure storage space than the traditional storehouses located at archaeological sites. In the museum, artefacts are more easily protected from theft, and they are stored in climate-controlled conditions.

The site museum project at Saqqara was conceived of in 1990, but it was not launched until 1997 after the authorities had identified a suitable location on the plateau where the museum could sit unobtrusively and not disturb the natural landscape. Construction was completed in 2003.

== Museum contents ==
The museum has six large halls in which one may admire masterpieces from Saqqara, such as a Ptolemaic mummy discovered by Zahi Hawass during the excavation of the Pyramid of Teti complex and a large double statue that was found near the causeway of the Unas complex. The statue depicts the 19th Dynasty High Priest of Mut, Amenemopet, and his wife.

In the entrance hall, the visitor is welcomed by a fragment of the Djoser statue on which one can read the name of the king and the architect Imhotep. This find was on loan from the Egyptian Museum in Cairo, and was exhibited only in the museum's opening months.

The second hall displays archaeological finds from various excavations on the Saqqara plateau. The artefacts in this exhibit will be rotated.

The third hall is devoted to Egyptian art, and contains vessels, statues, and stelae made of wood and stone, as well as the ancient tools used to build the monuments.

The fourth hall exhibits architectural elements from the Step Pyramid complex, such as columns and the green and blue faience wall tiles that decorate chambers under the pyramid complex. A small statue of Imhotep is also found in this room.

The fifth hall displays objects used in burials from the 6th Dynasty through the New Kingdom.

A gallery dedicated to the French Egyptologist, Jean-Philippe Lauer, displays some of his personal effects and photographs of him at work on the plateau. His library is recreated in one room. Lauer began working at the Djoser complex in the 1920s and continued to work there for the remainder of his career, some 75 years.

== See also ==
- List of museums in Egypt
- List of museums of Egyptian antiquities
