= Museo Egizio =

Archaeological museum in Turin, Italy

Egyptian Museum of Turin
- Museo Egizio di Torino

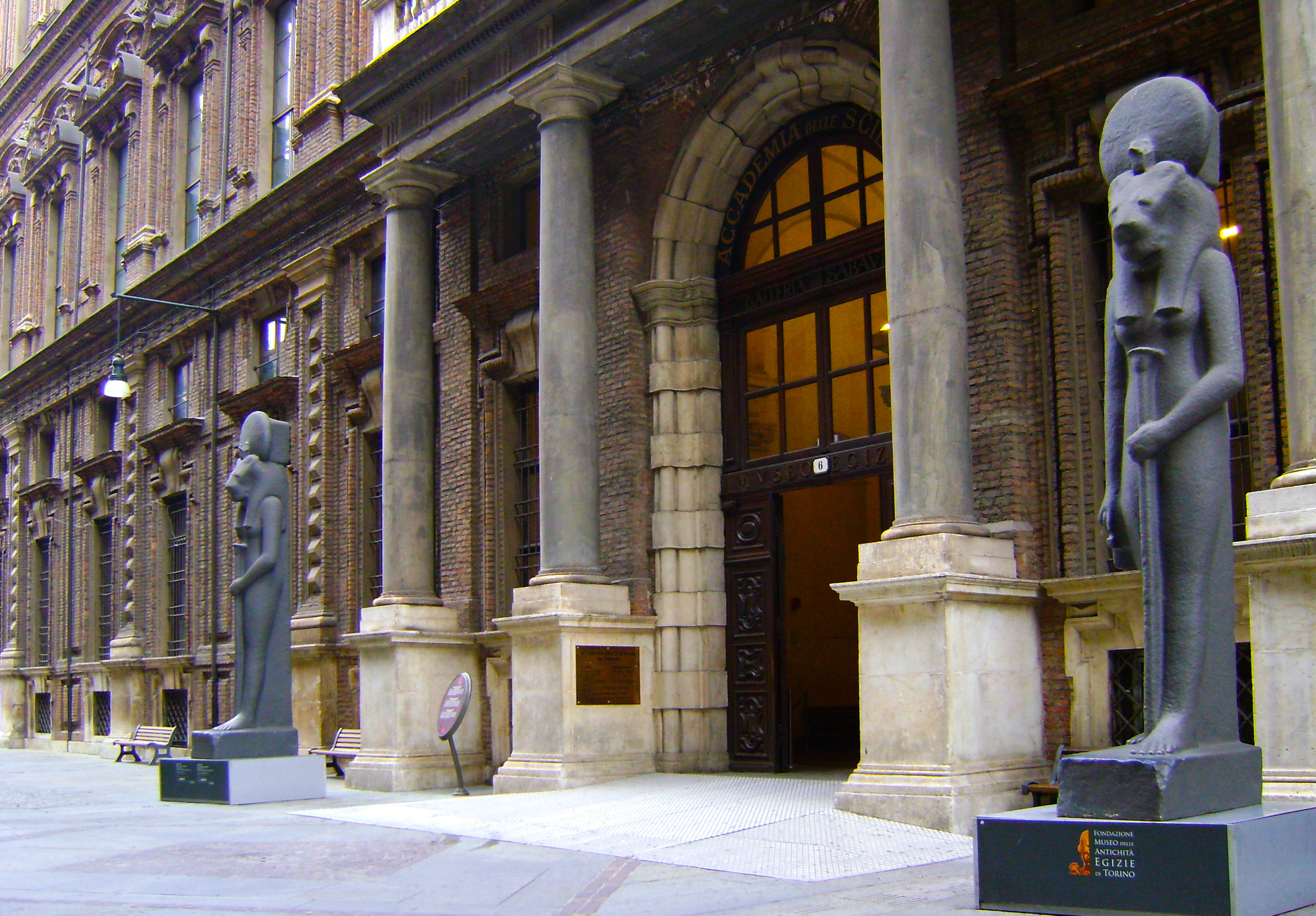
- Entrance

- Location within Turin
- Former name: Regio Museo di Antichità ed Egizio
- Established: 1824; 202 years ago
- Location: Via Accademia delle Scienze, 6 Turin, Italy
- Coordinates: 45.068°N 7.684°E
- Type: Egyptian museum
- Collections: Egyptian art and artifacts
- Visitors: 1,036,689 (2024)
- Founder: Charles Felix of Sardinia
- Director: Christian Greco
- Website: www.museoegizio.it

The Museo Egizio (Italian pronunciation: [muˈzɛːo eˈdʒittsjo]) or Egyptian Museum is an archaeological museum in Turin, Italy, specializing in Egyptian archaeology and anthropology. It houses one of the largest collections of Egyptian antiquities, with more than 40,000 artifacts, which is considered the second most important Egyptological collection in the world after the one at the Egyptian Museum of Cairo. Founded in 1824 by King Charles Felix, it is the world's oldest museum dedicated entirely to ancient Egyptian culture. In 2024, it received 1,036,689 visitors, making it one of the most visited museums in Italy.

== History ==
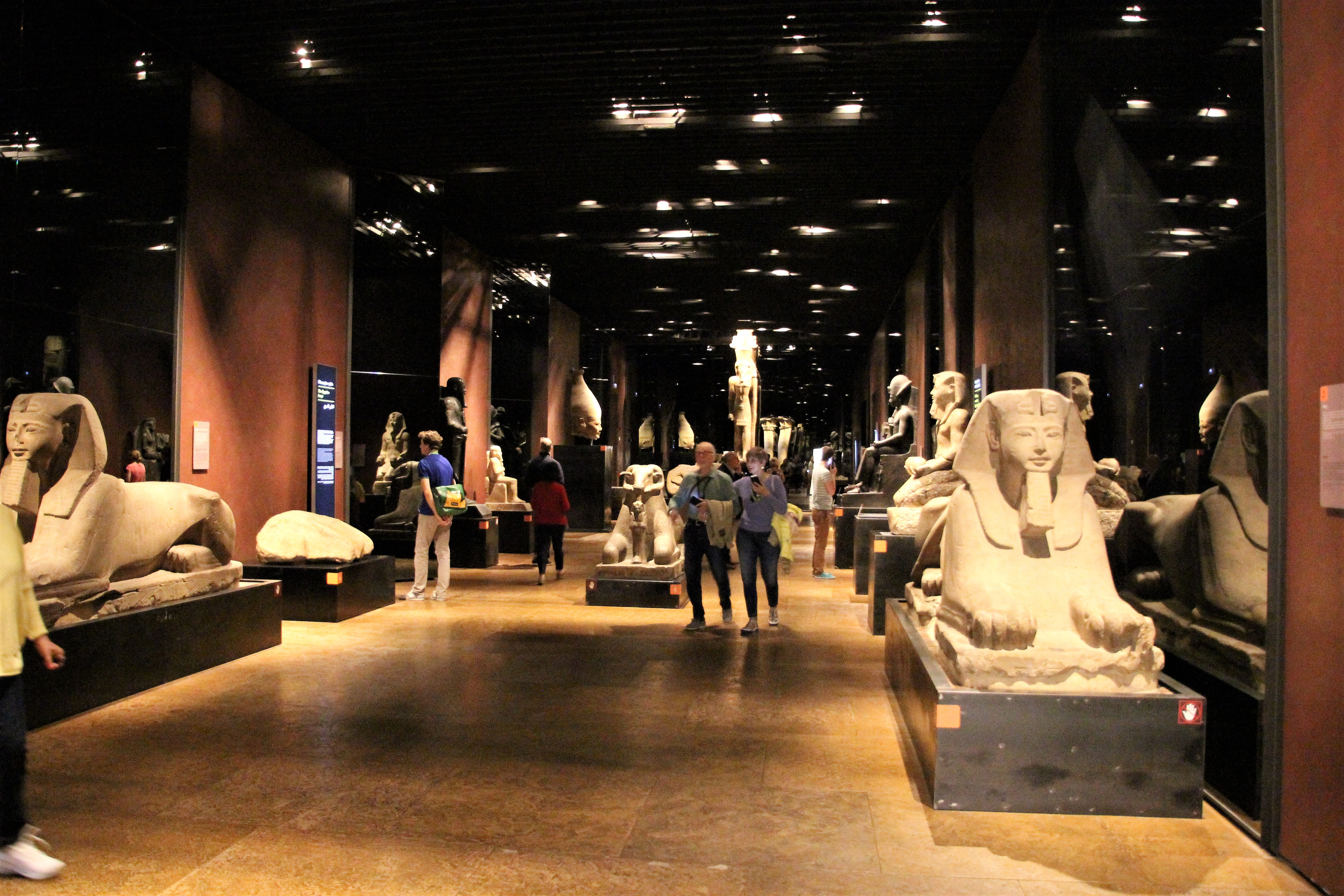
The Gallery of Kings at the Museo Egizio

The first object having an association with Egypt to arrive in Turin was the Mensa Isiaca in 1630, an altar table in imitation of Egyptian style, which Dulu Jones suggests had been created for a temple to Isis in Rome. This exotic piece spurred King Charles Emmanuel III to commission botanist Vitaliano Donati to travel to Egypt in 1753 and acquire items from its past. Donati returned with 300 pieces recovered from Karnak and Coptos, which became the nucleus of the Turin collection.

In 1824, King Charles Felix acquired the material from the Drovetti collection (5,268 pieces, including 100 statues, 170 papyri, stelae, mummies, and other items), that the French General Consul, Bernardino Drovetti, had built during his stay in Egypt. In the same year, Jean-François Champollion used the huge Turin collection of papyri to test his breakthroughs in deciphering the hieroglyphic writing. The time Champollion spent in Turin studying the texts is also the origin of a legend about the mysterious disappearance of the "Papiro dei Re", that was only later found and of which some portions are still unavailable. In 1950, a parapsychologist was contacted to pinpoint them, to no avail.

In 1833, the collection of Piedmontese Giuseppe Sossio (over 1,200 pieces) was added to the Egyptian Museum. The collection was complemented and completed by the finds of Egyptologist Ernesto Schiaparelli, during his excavation campaigns between 1900 and 1920, which further filled out the collection. Its last major acquisition was the small temple of Ellesiya, which the Egyptian government presented to Italy for her assistance during the Nubian monument salvage campaign in the 1960s.

Through all these years, the Egyptian collection has always been in Turin, in the building designed for the purpose of housing it, in Via Accademia delle Scienze 6. Only during the Second World War was some of the material moved to the town of Agliè. The museum became an experiment of the Italian government in privatization of the nation's museums when the Fondazione Museo delle Antichità Egizie was officially established at the end of 2004. The building itself was remodelled in celebration of the 2006 Winter Olympics, with its main rooms redesigned by Dante Ferretti, and "featured an imaginative use of lighting and mirrors in a spectacular display of some of the most important and impressive Pharaonic statues in the museum collection."

On April 1, 2015, a new layout of the museum was opened.

The new logo, the coordinated image and the exhibition system have been designed by the studio Migliore+Servetto Architects, whose founders, Ico Migliore and Mara Servetto, are creative advisor for the museum.

== Collection ==
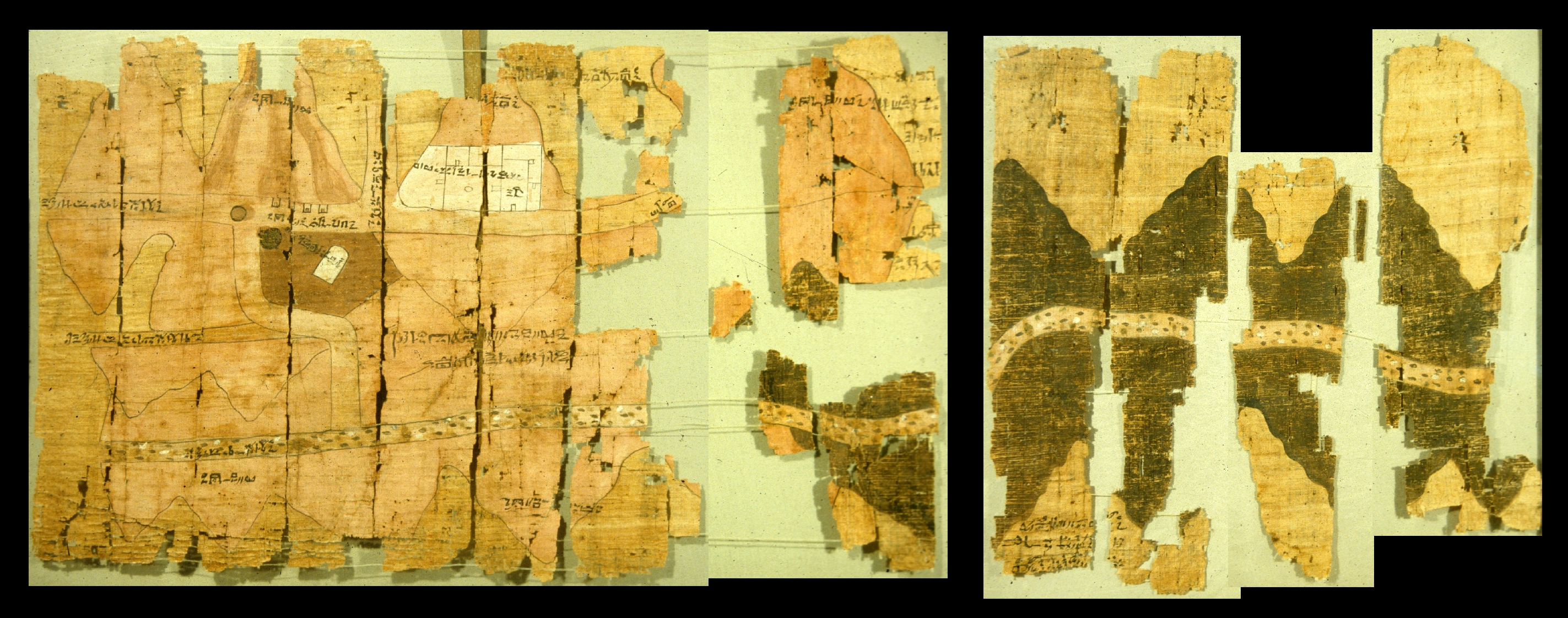
Turin Papyrus Map

There are more than 37,000 items in the museum, covering a period from the Paleolithic to the Coptic era. The most important are:

- Assemblea dei Re (Kings Assembly), a term originally indicating a collection of statues representing all the kings of the New Kingdom
- Temple of Ellesyia, donated as part of the International Campaign to Save the Monuments of Nubia
- sarcophagi, mummies and Books of the Dead originally belonging to the "Drovetti collection"
- a painted fabric from Gebelein dated at about 3500 BC, discovered in 1930 by Giulio Farina
- ostracon of Prince Sethherkhepshef
- funerary paraphernalia from the Tomba di Ignoti (Tomb of Unknown) from the Old Kingdom
- Tomb of Kha and Merit (TT8), found intact by Schiaparelli in 1906 and transferred as a whole to the museum
- wall paintings and burial equipment from the Tomb of Iti and Neferu at Gebelein
- Bembine Tablet
- Tomba dipinta (Painted Tomb), usually closed to the public
- Papyrus collection room, originally collected by Drovetti and later used by Champollion during his studies for the decoding of the hieroglyphics
- Turin King List (or Turin Royal Canon)
- Turin Papyrus Map
- Turin Erotic Papyrus
- Judicial Papyrus of Turin

The Egyptian Museum owns three different versions of the Egyptian Book of the Dead, including the most ancient copy known. An integral illustrated version and the personal copy of the architect Kha, found by Schiaparelli in 1906, are normally shown to the public.

== Multaka network ==
In 2019, the museum joined six similar museums in Germany, the United Kingdom, Greece and Switzerland, creating the international Multaka network. This intercultural museum project organizes guided tours for refugees and migrants designed and offered for free by specially trained Arabic-speaking Multaka guides. The visitor-centered discussions with migrants in their language are focused on the historical origin and history of acquisition of cultural objects, including the visitors' own understanding of their country's cultural heritage.

== Gallery ==
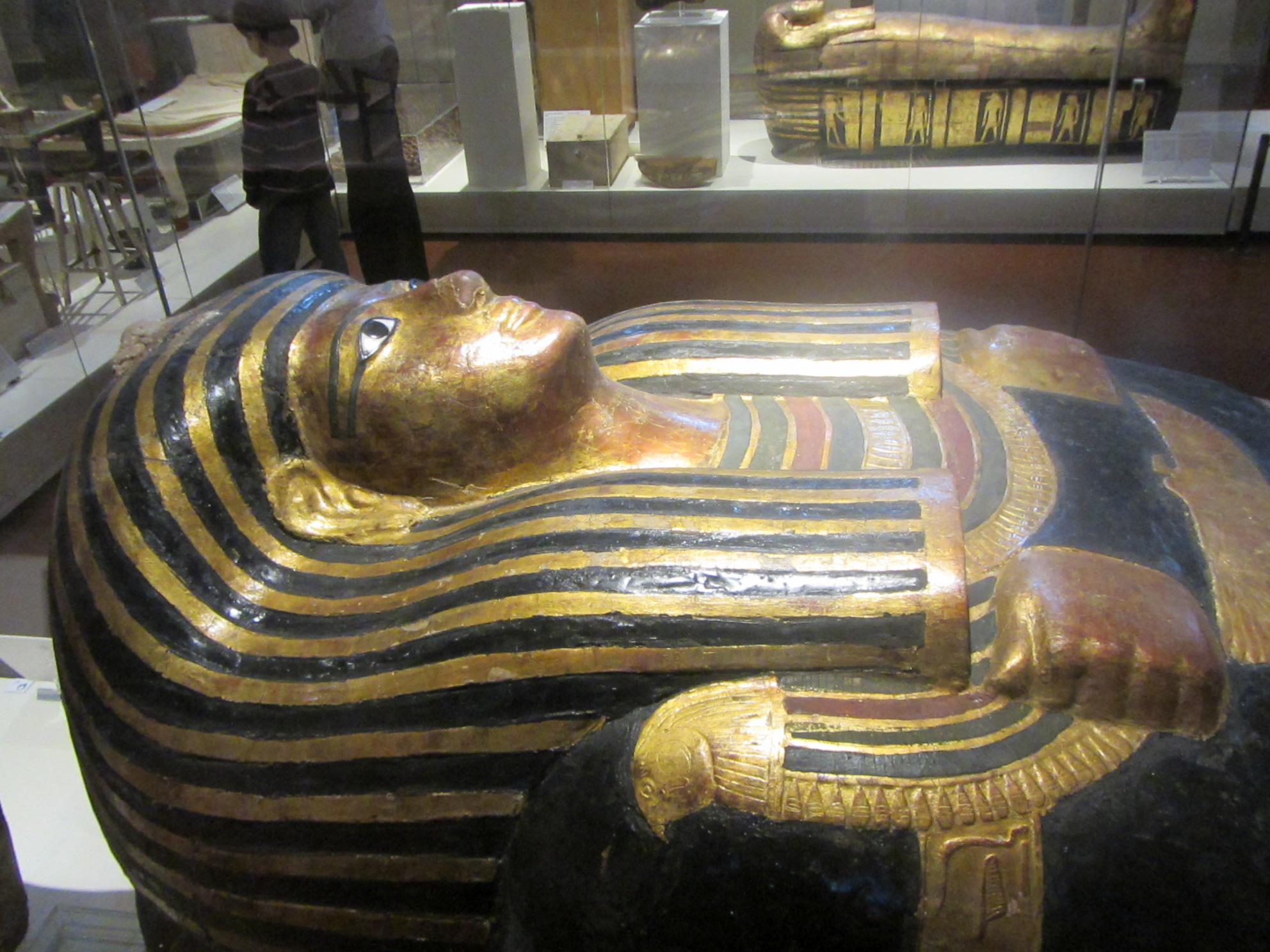
Outermost mummiform coffin of Kha

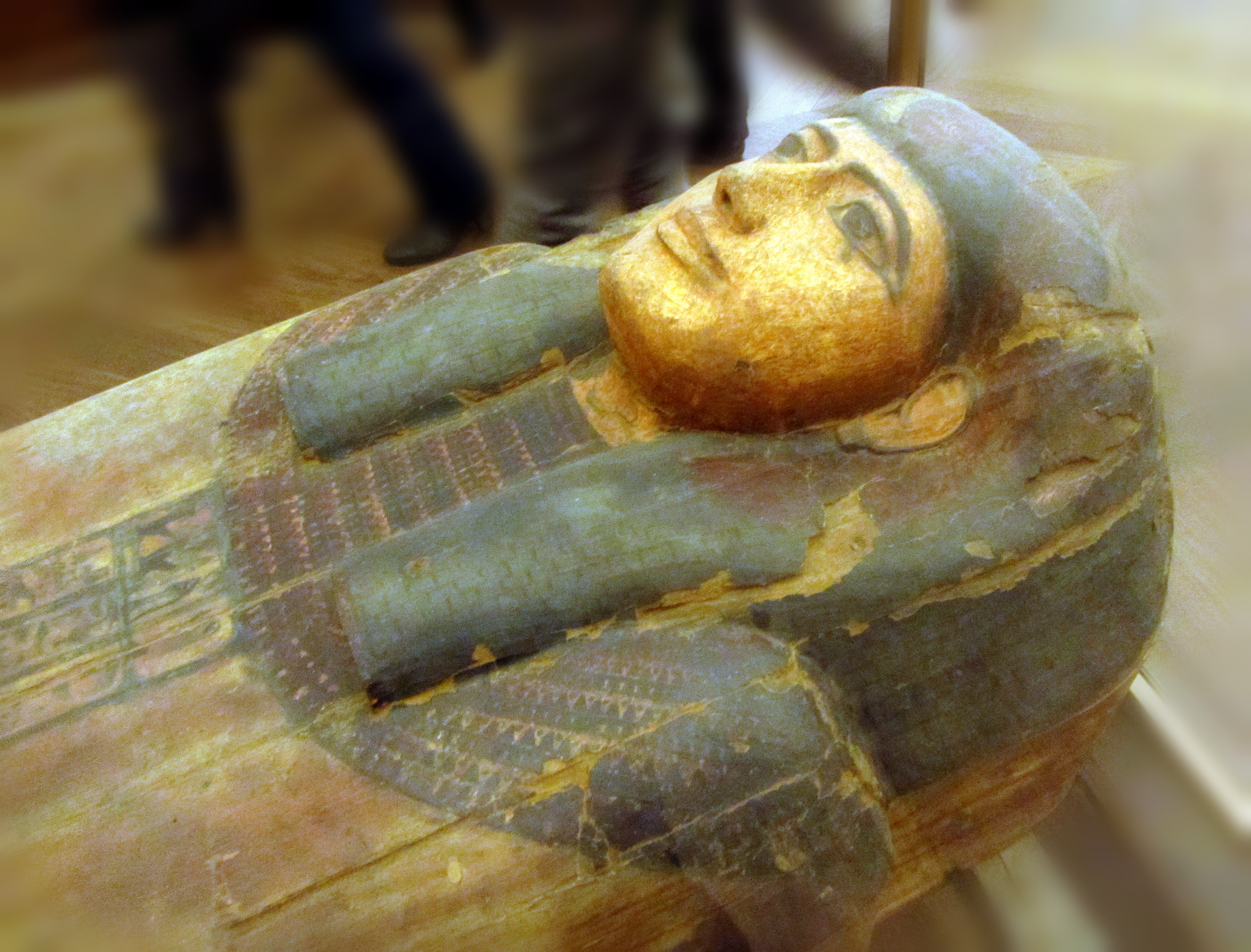
Ancient Egyptian sarcophagus

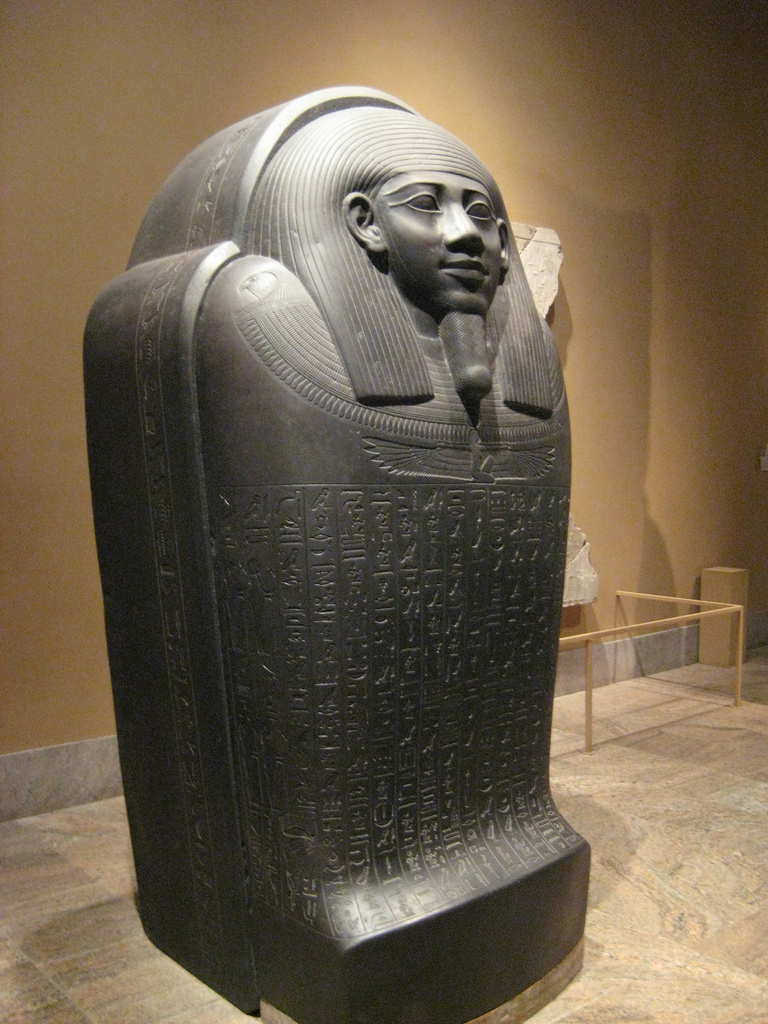
Sarcophagus of Horkhebit

Sarcophagus of Ibi

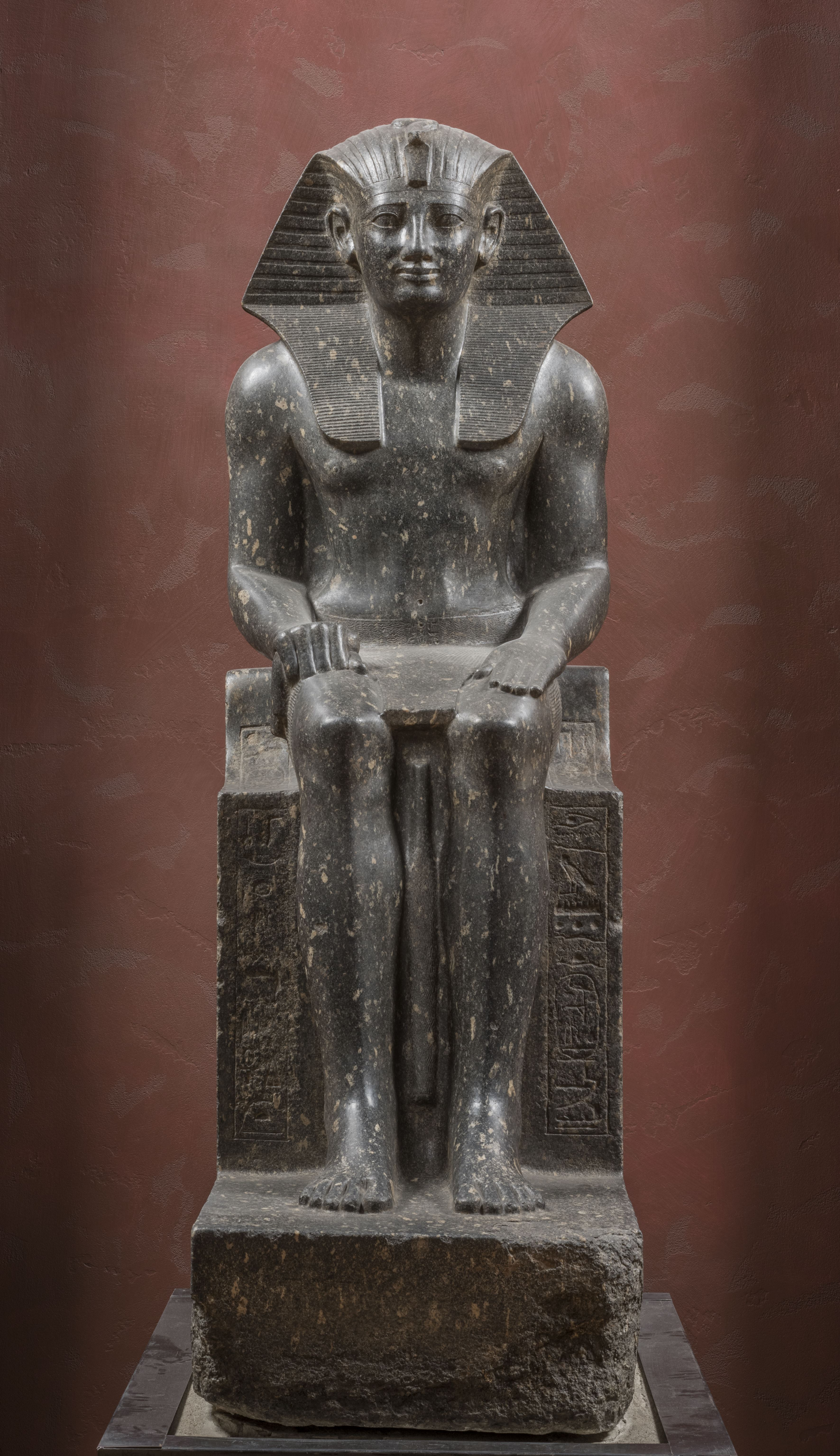
Statue of Senusret I that was later usurped, recarved and reinscribed for Thutmose I

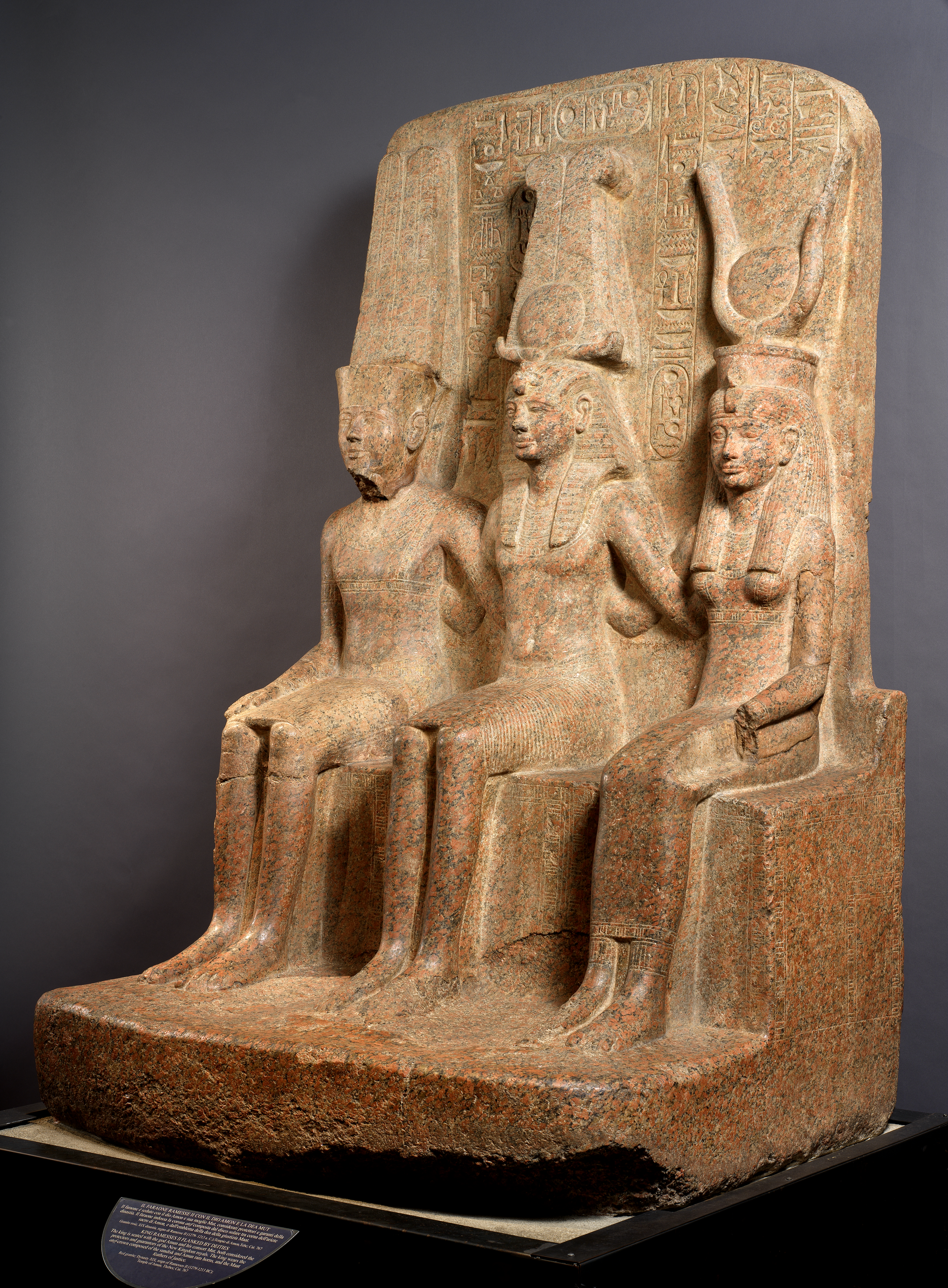
Statue of Ramesses II with Amun and Hathor

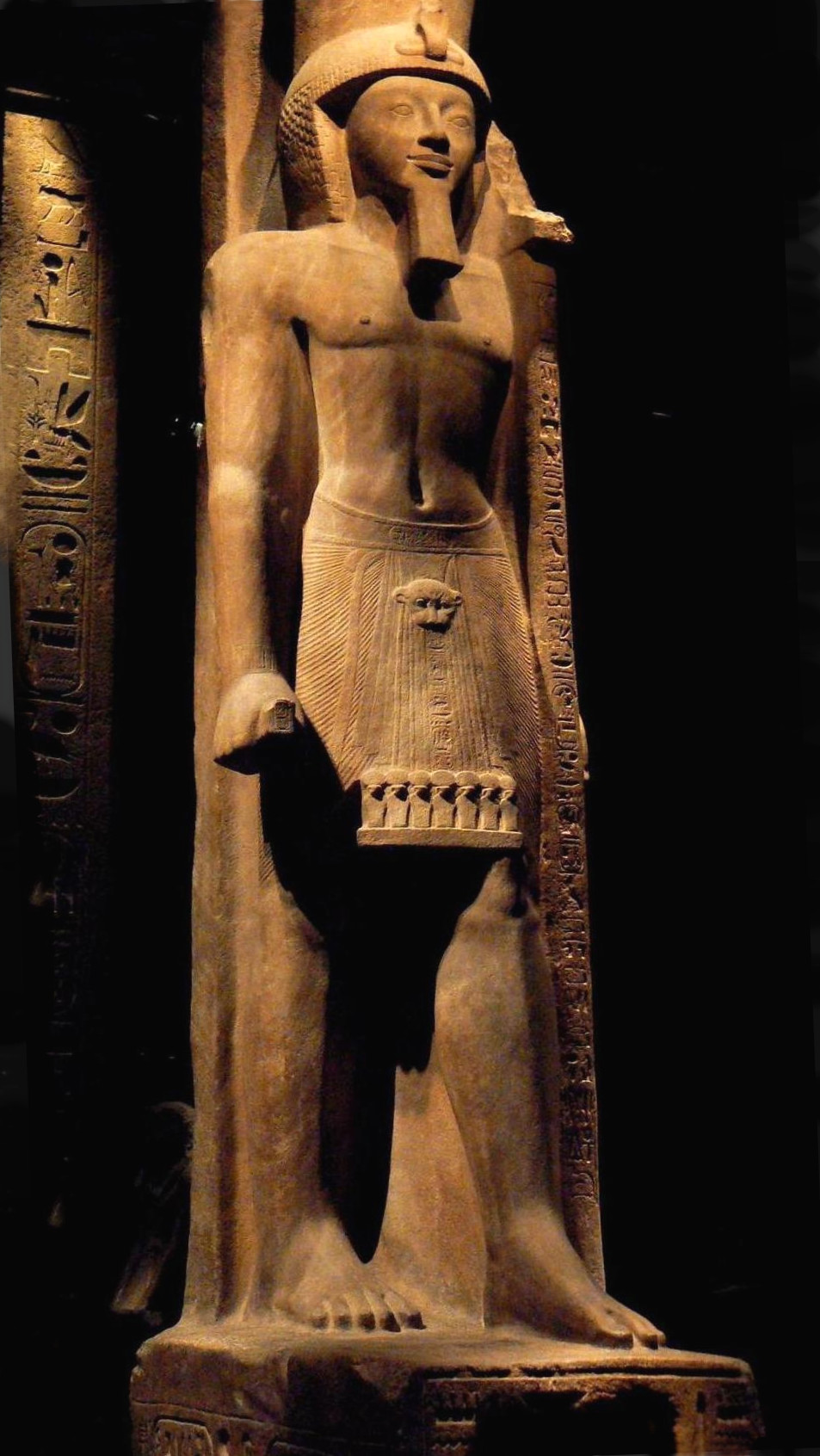
Statue of Seti II

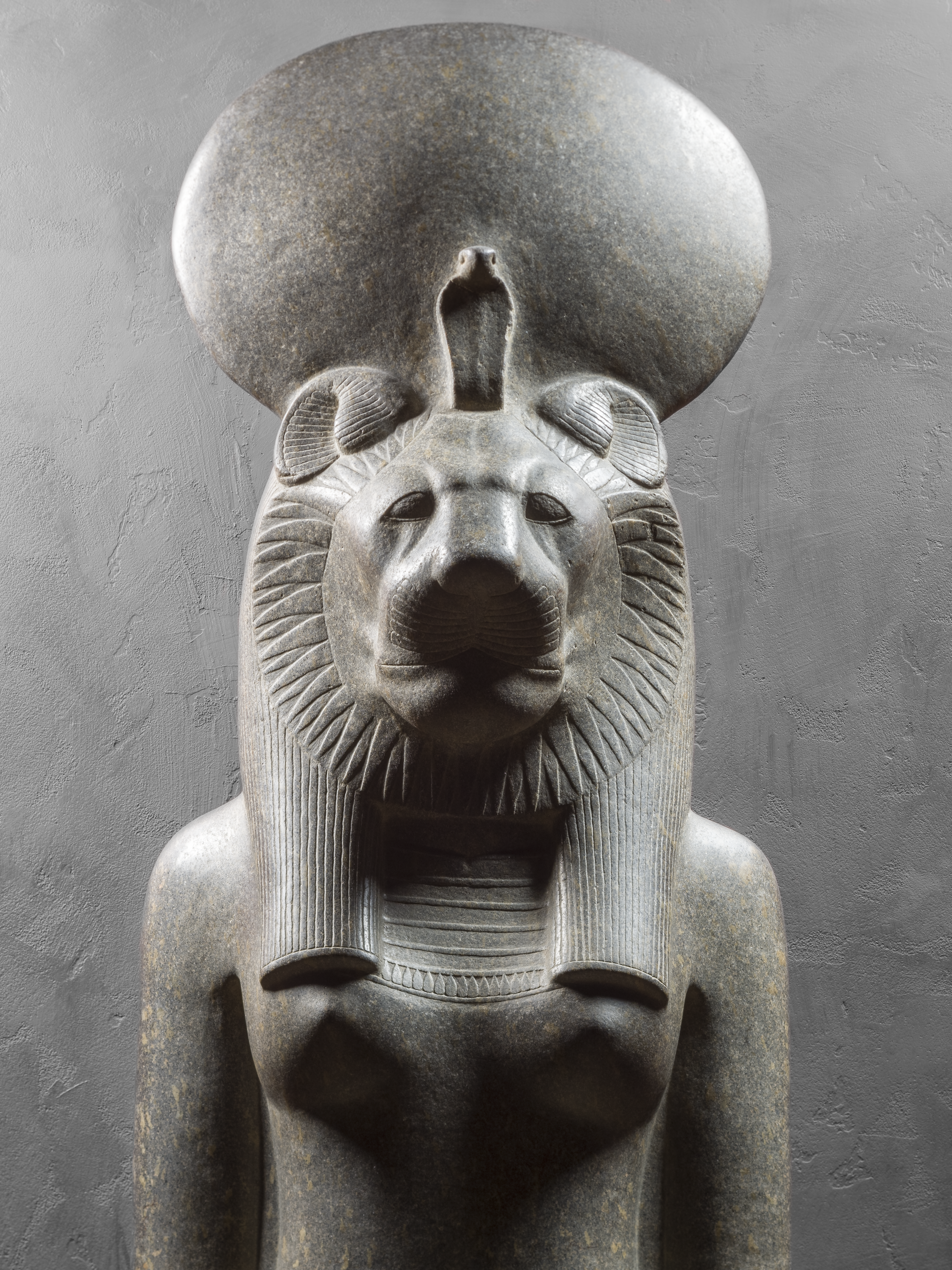
Statue of Sekhmet

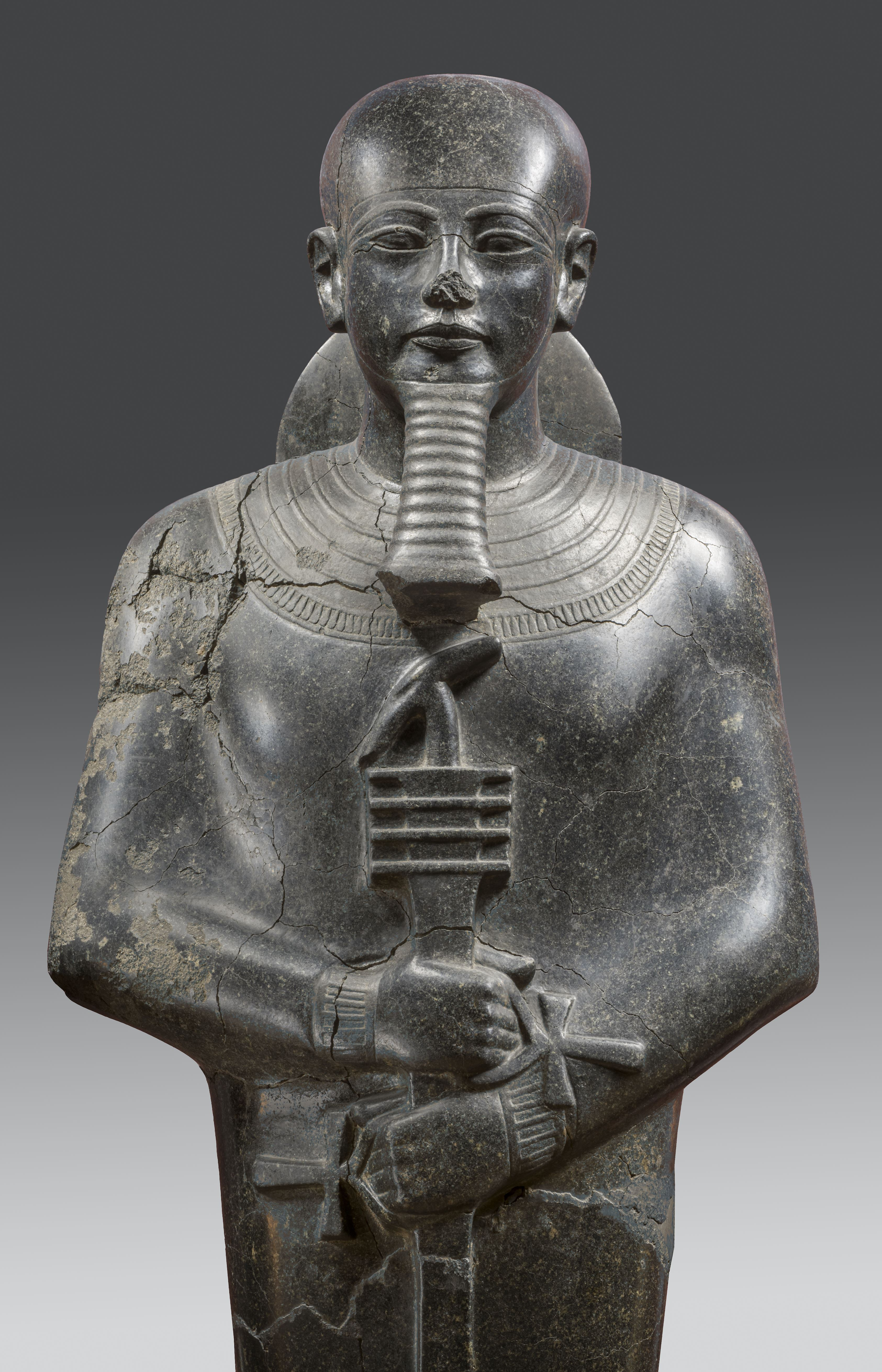
Statue of Ptah

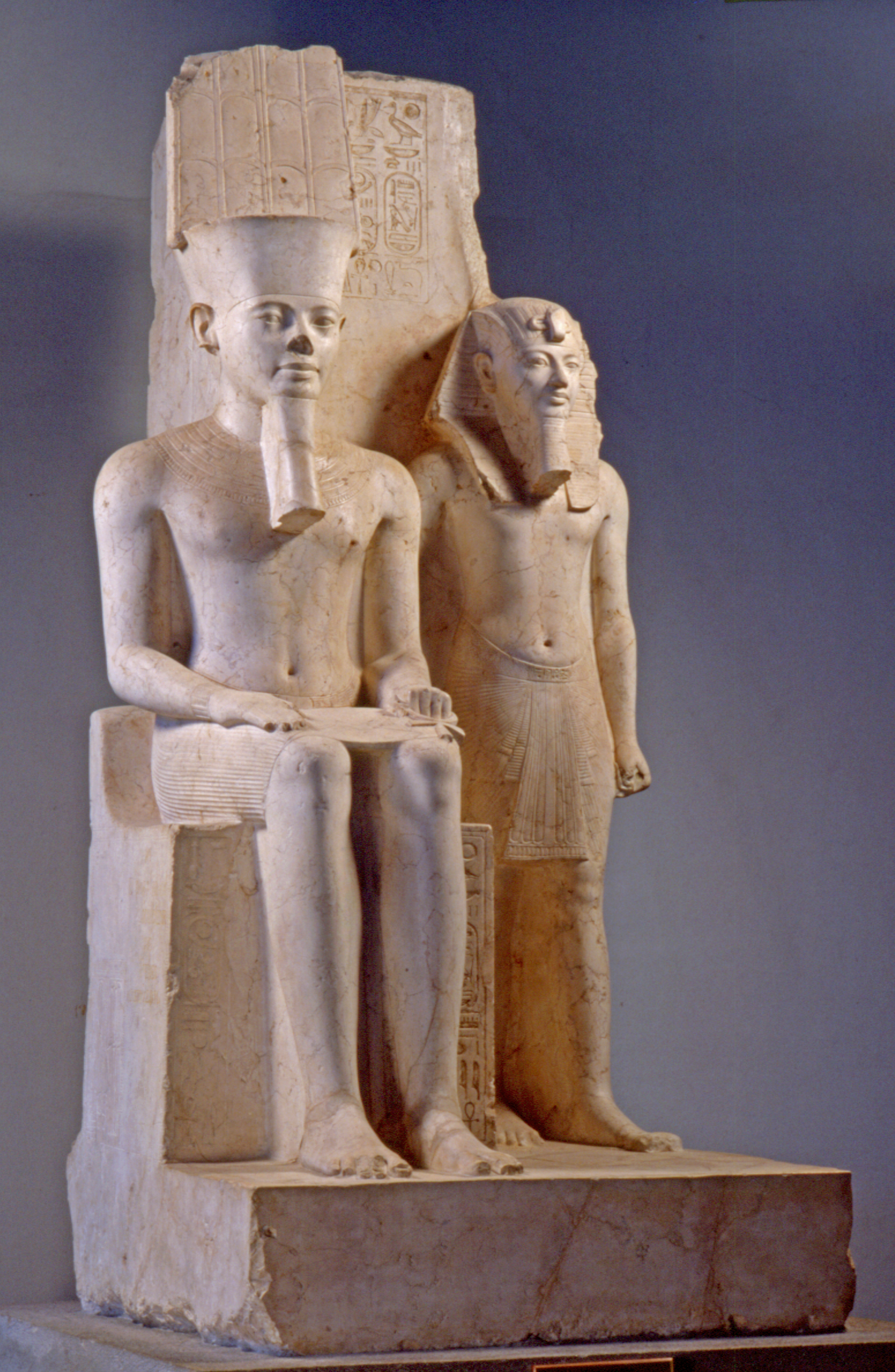
Statue of Horemheb with Amun

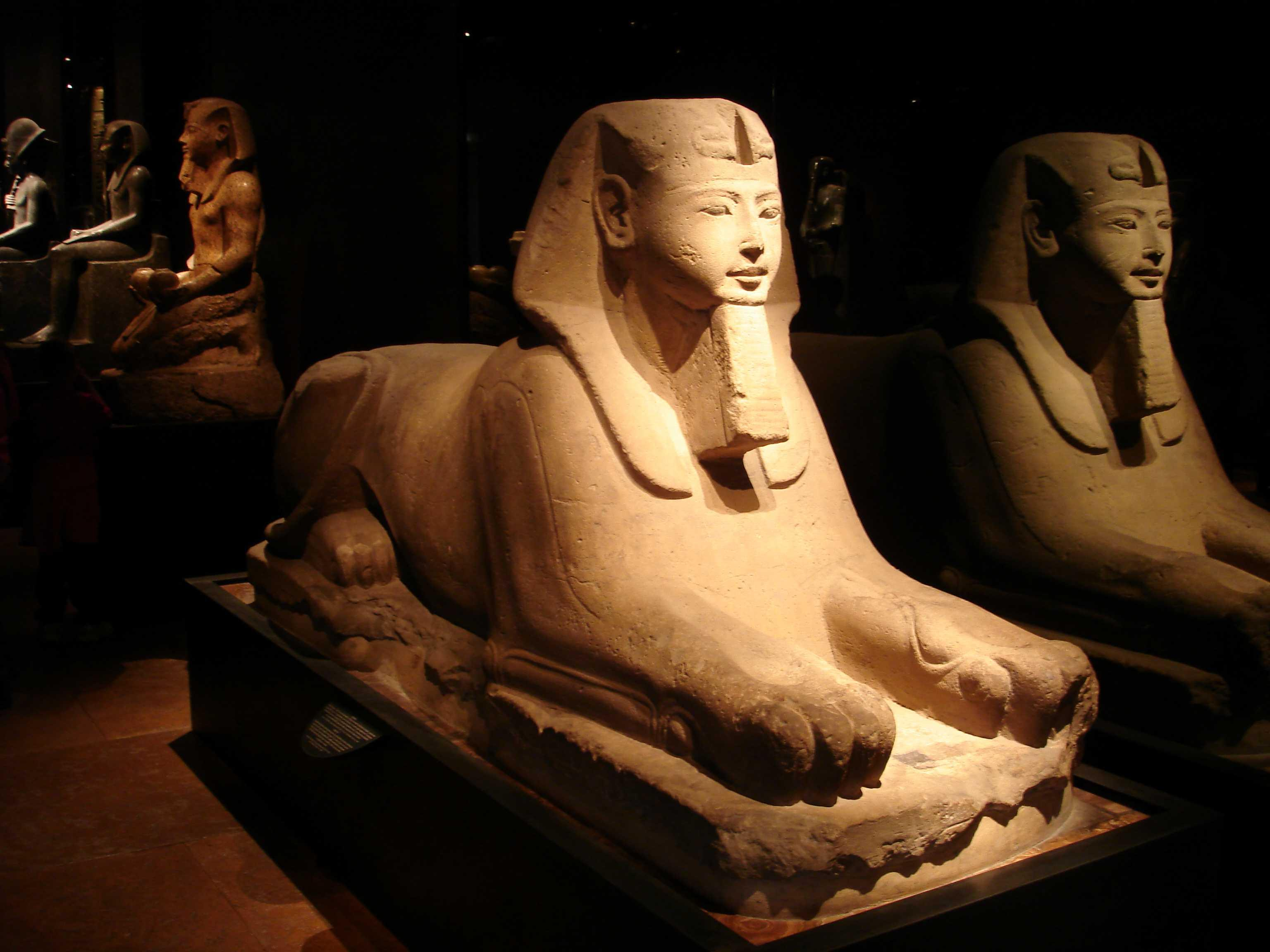
Sphinx of the Nineteenth Dynasty

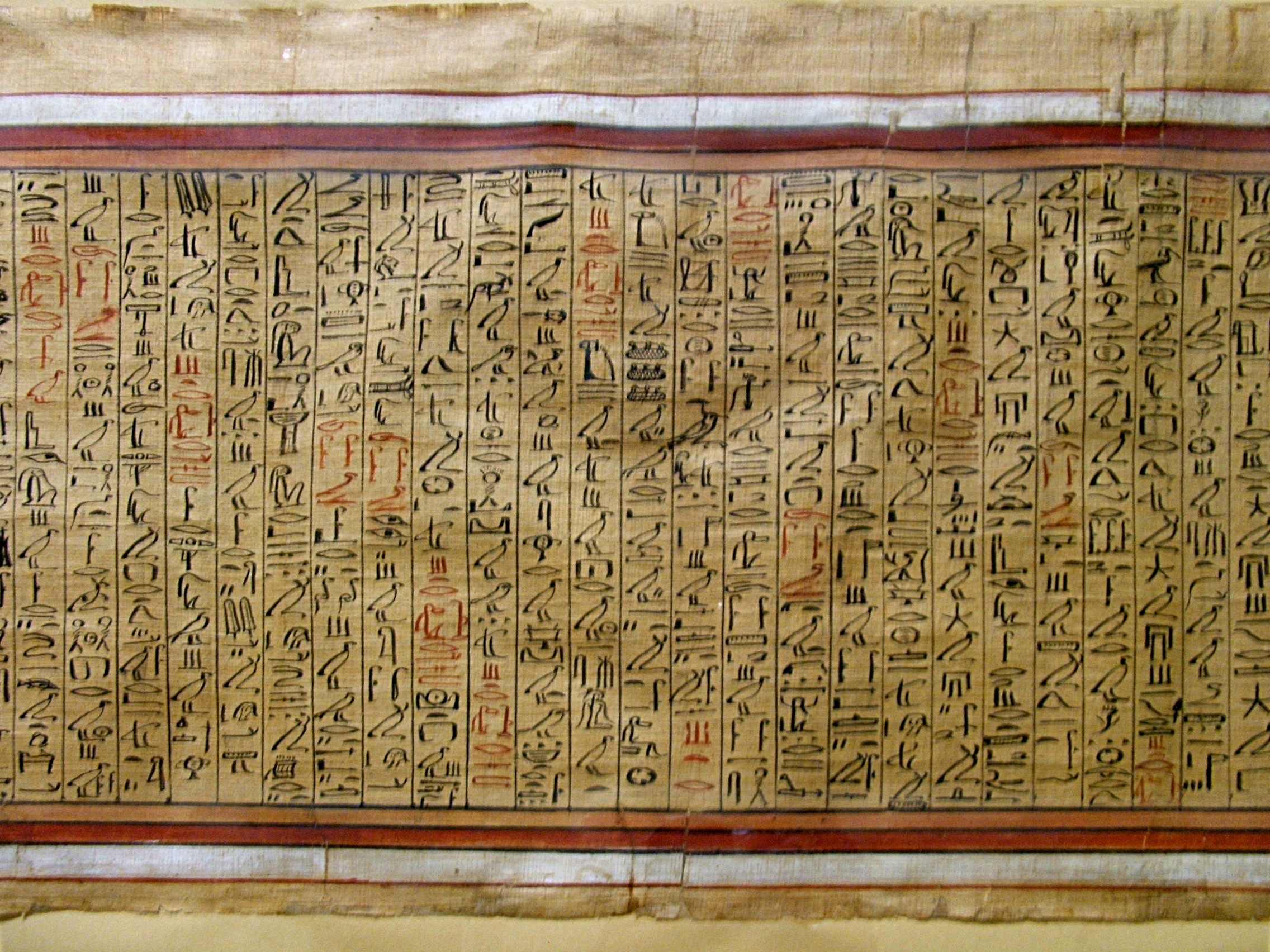
A section of text from Kha's Book of the Dead papyrus

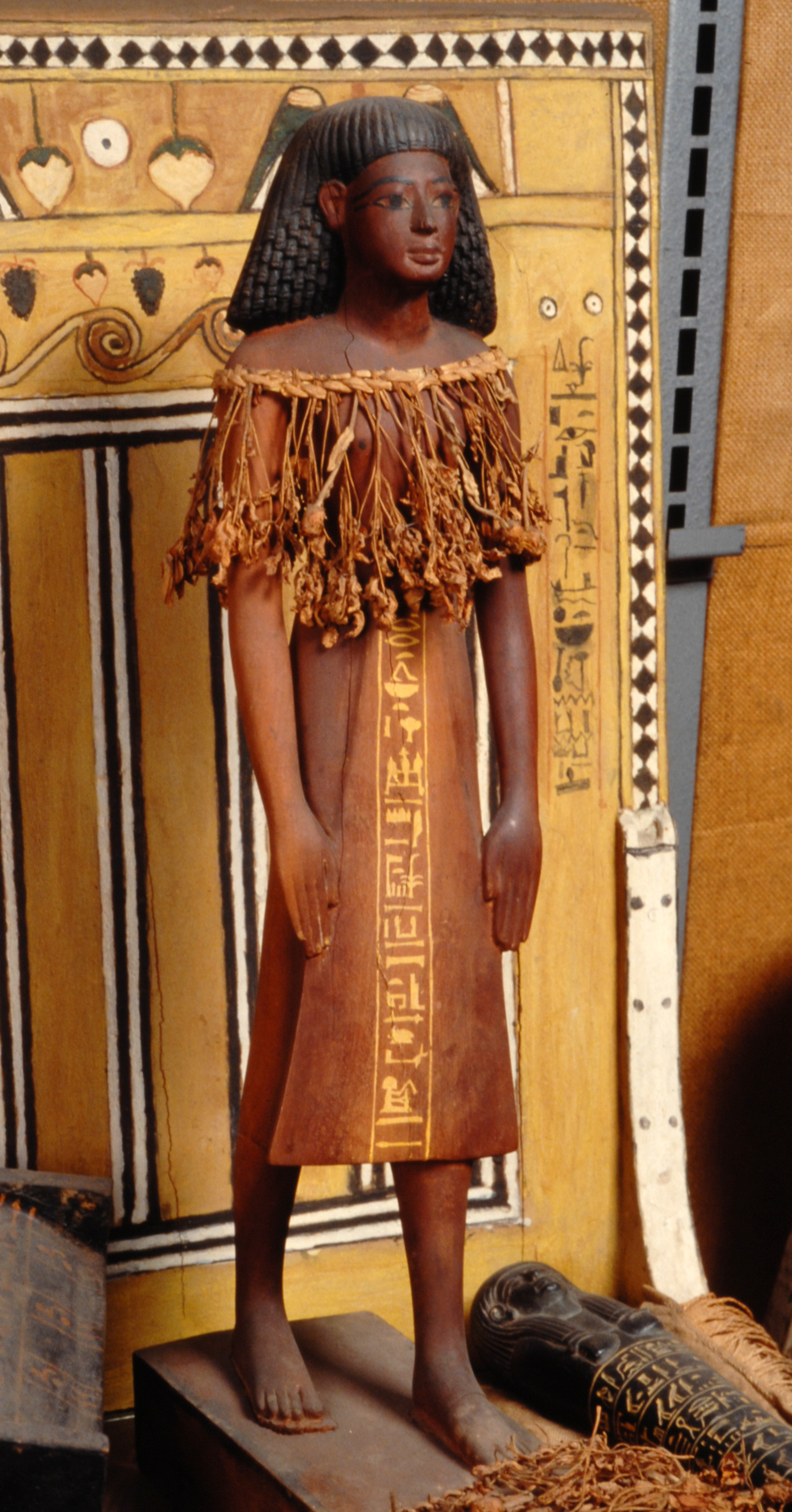
Statuette of Kha

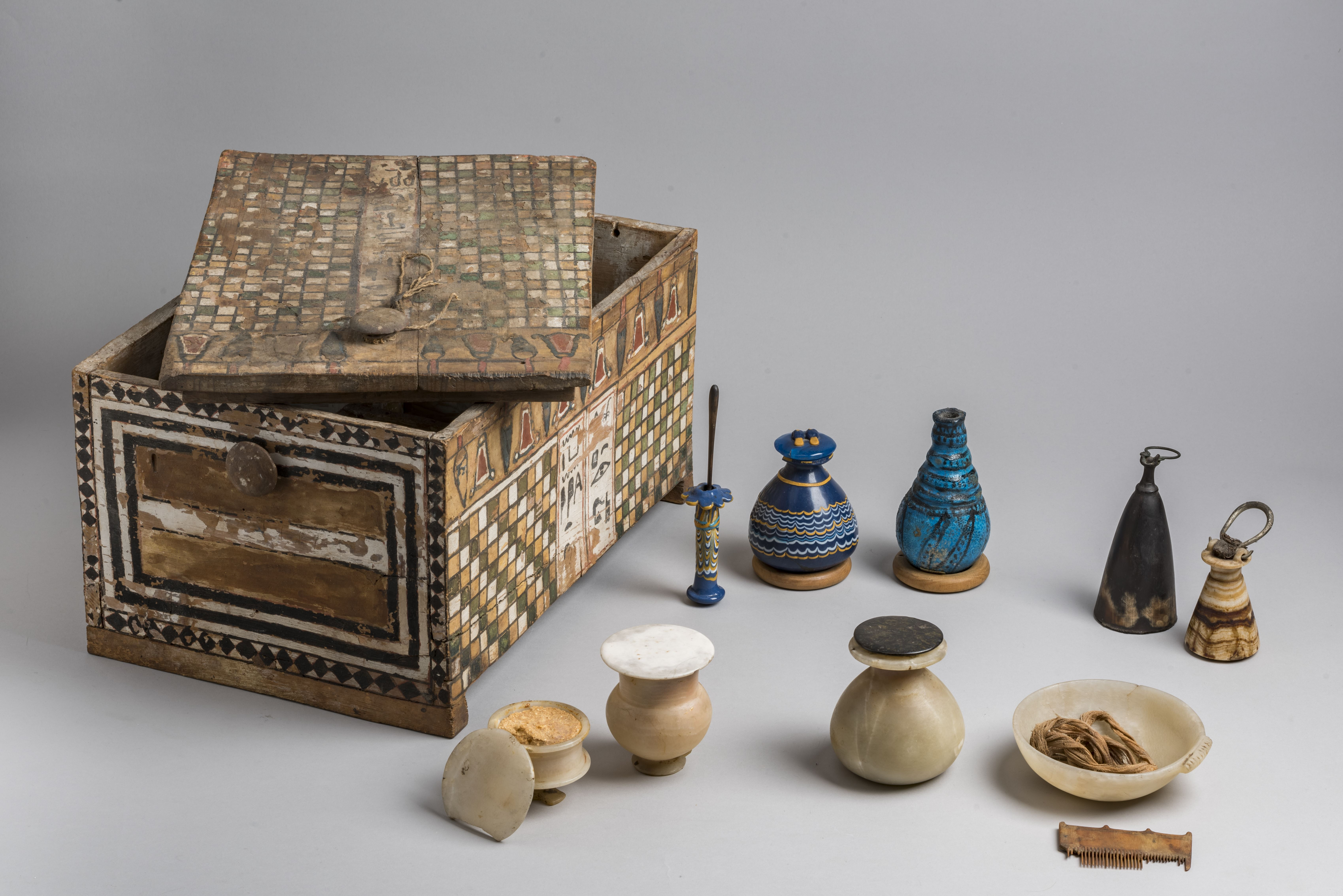
Merit's cosmetic box and contents from TT8

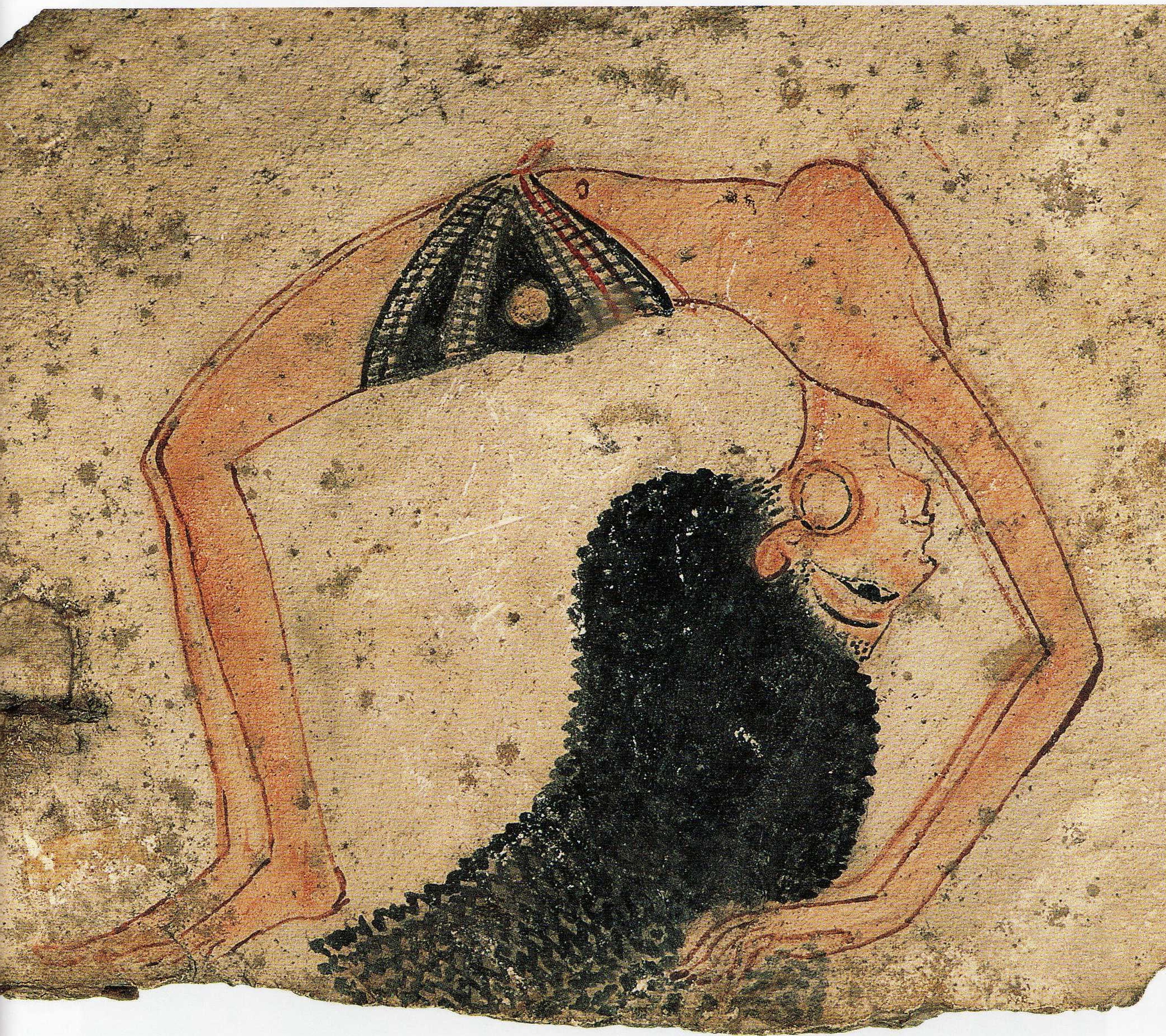
Egyptian dancer

== See also ==
- List of museums of Egyptian antiquities
- Egyptian Museum
- Grand Egyptian Museum
- Egyptian Museum (Milan)
- List of Jesuit sites
- List of largest art museums

== Works ==
- Wolfgang Kosack: Schenute von Atripe De judicio finale. Papyruskodex 63000.IV im Museo Egizio di Torino. Einleitung, Textbearbeitung und Übersetzung herausgegeben von Wolfgang Kosack. Berlin 2013, Verlag Brunner Christoph, ISBN 978-3-9524018-5-9
- Wolfgang Kosack: Basilios "De archangelo Michael": sahidice Pseudo - Euhodios "De resurrectione": sahidice Pseudo - Euhodios "De dormitione Mariae virginis": sahidice & bohairice : < Papyruskodex Turin, Mus. Egizio Cat. 63000 XI. > nebst Varianten und Fragmente. In Parallelzeilen ediert, kommentiert und übersetzt von Wolfgang Kosack. Verlag Christoph Brunner, Berlin 2014. ISBN 978-3-906206-02-8.
