= Alexandria National Museum =

Coordinates: 31.2011°N 29.9132°E

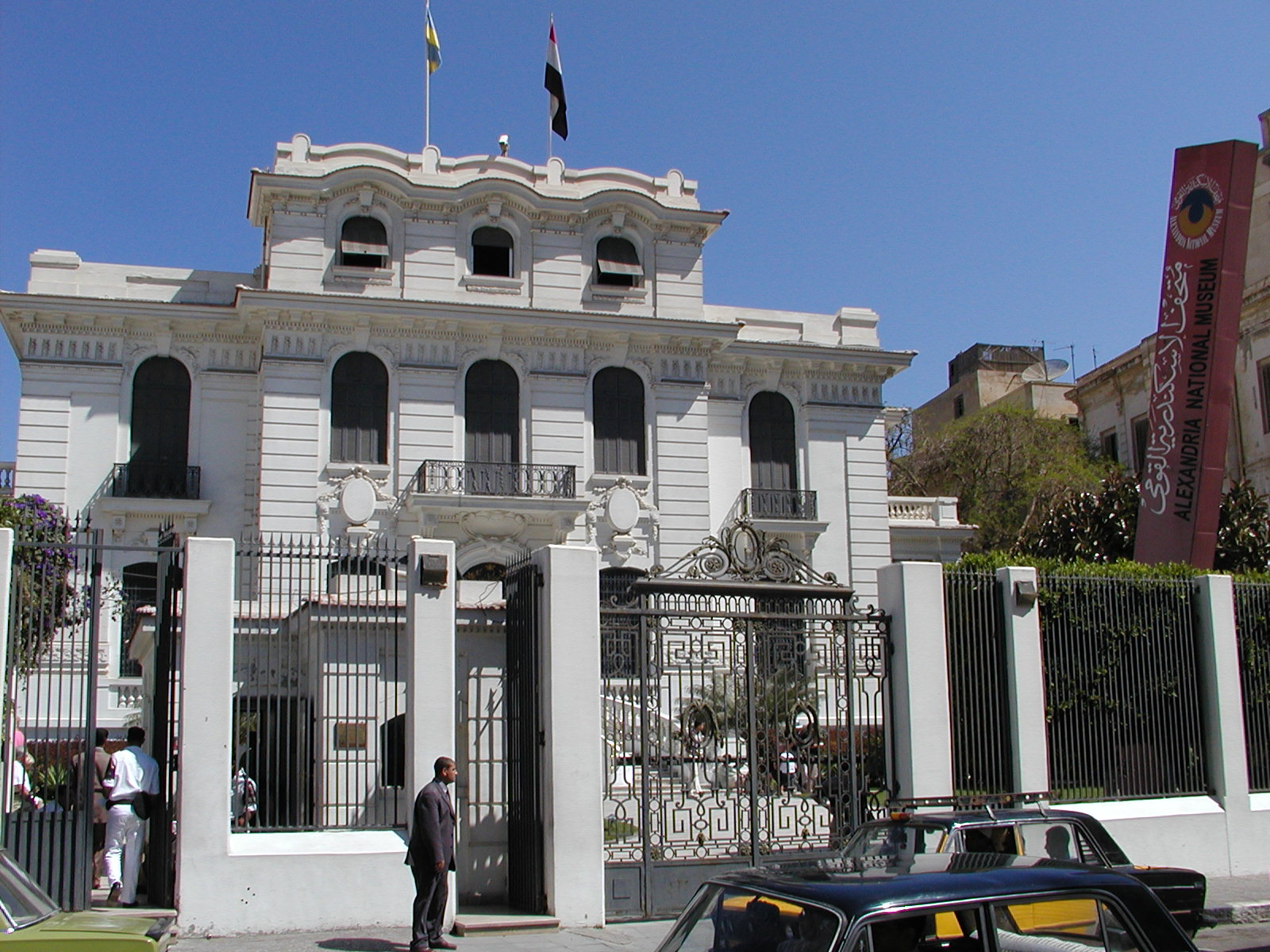
- Alexandria National Museum
- Established: 2003
- Location: Alexandria, Egypt
- Type: archaeological museum

The Alexandria National Museum (ANM) is a museum in Alexandria, Egypt. It was inaugurated the 31 December 2003 by Hosni Mubarak and it is located in a renovated Italian style palace in Tariq Al-Horreya Street (former Rue Fouad). The building used to be home to the United States consulate.

== History ==
The museum is located in a former Italianate mansion. It's the former home of a wood sales person. It used to house the United States consulate. The building dates back to 1926, located around a large garden, in addition to housing a basement. The three-storey palace was a meeting place for the Egyptian upper-class society of Alexandria.

== Collection ==
The Alexandria National Museum contains around 1,800 artifacts that narrate the story of Alexandria and Egypt. Most of these pieces came from other Egyptian museums. The museum mainly focuses on three collections spread over three floors:

- Floor 1: Pharaonic epoch. The mummies are shown in a recreation of a funerary chamber.
- Floor 2: Artifacts from the Hellenistic period and Roman period, including pieces from Heraklion and Canopus. Objects include canopic jars, and pieces from the rule of Nectanebo II. Objects include pieces of Caracalla, figures of Medusa, a mosaic portrait, representing Queen Berenice II wife of Ptolemy III.
- Floor 3: Ancient Egyptian, Coptic, and the Muslim world as well as 19th and 20th century. The city of Alexandria is also included in the collection.

A highlight for many visitors is a sculpture believed to be of the VP city's namesake, Alexander the Great.

The museum also has a collection of jewelry, weapons, statuary, numismatics and glassware.

== Gallery ==
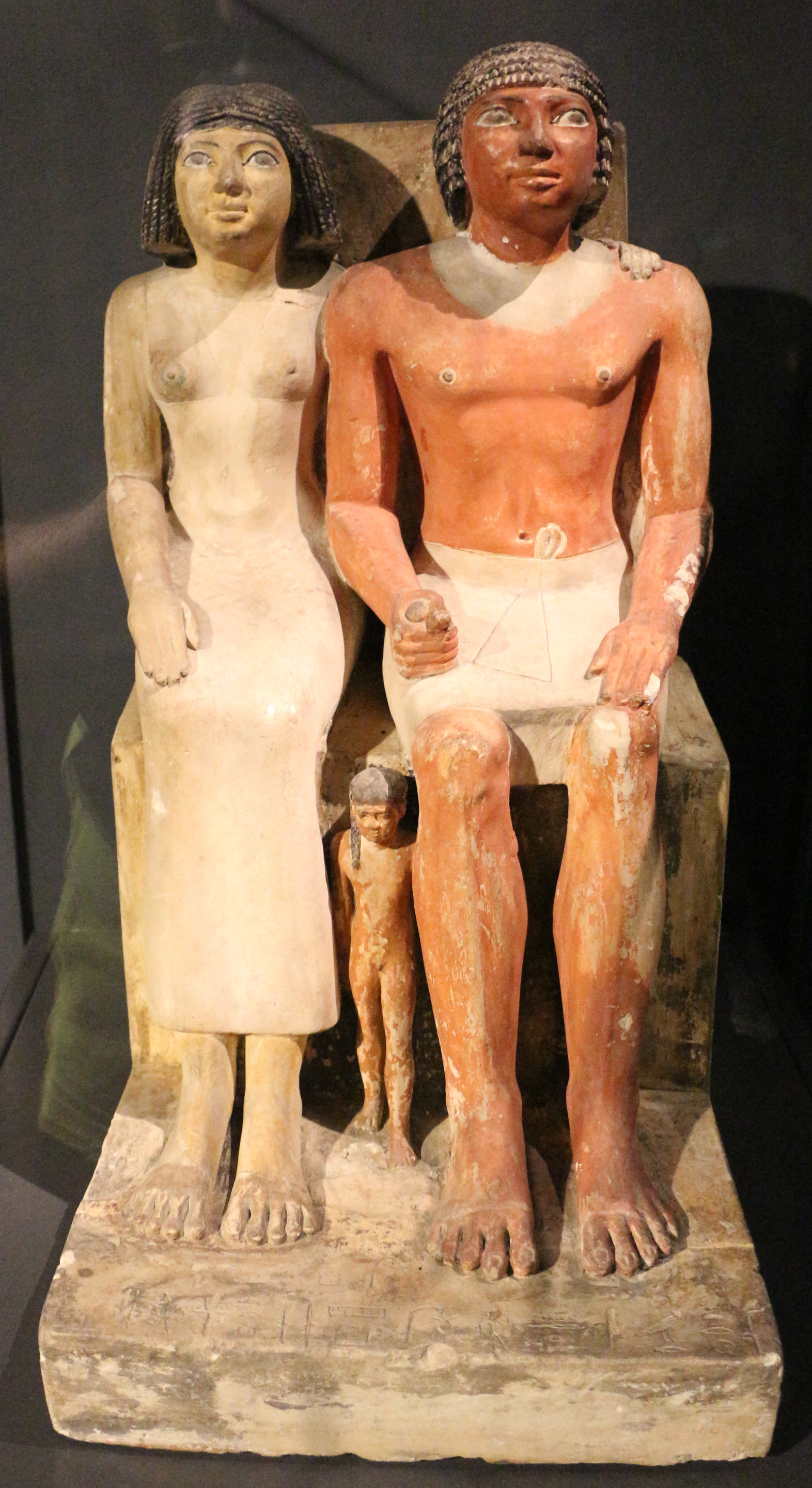
Statue of Weshka with family

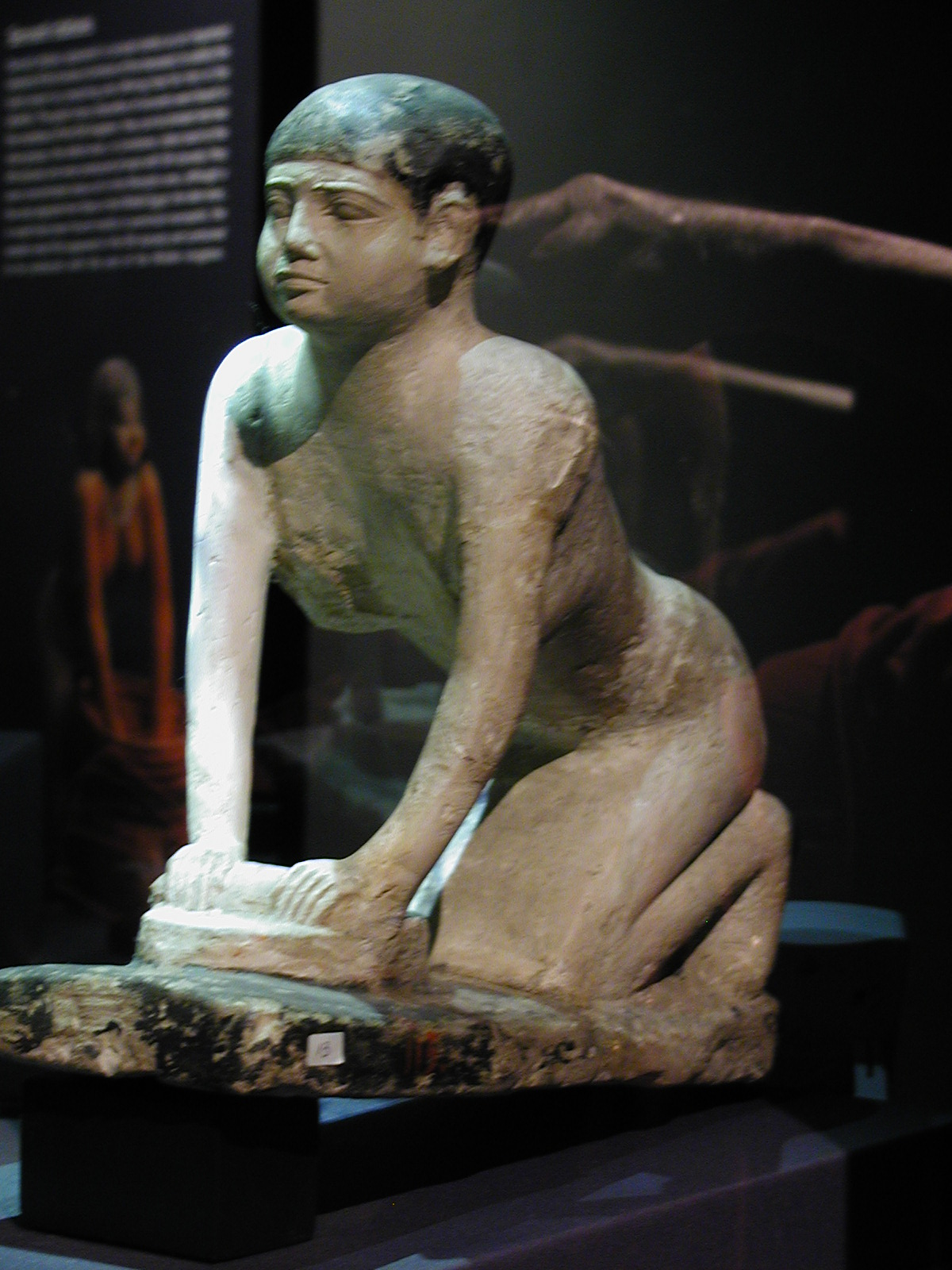
Ushabti kneading bread

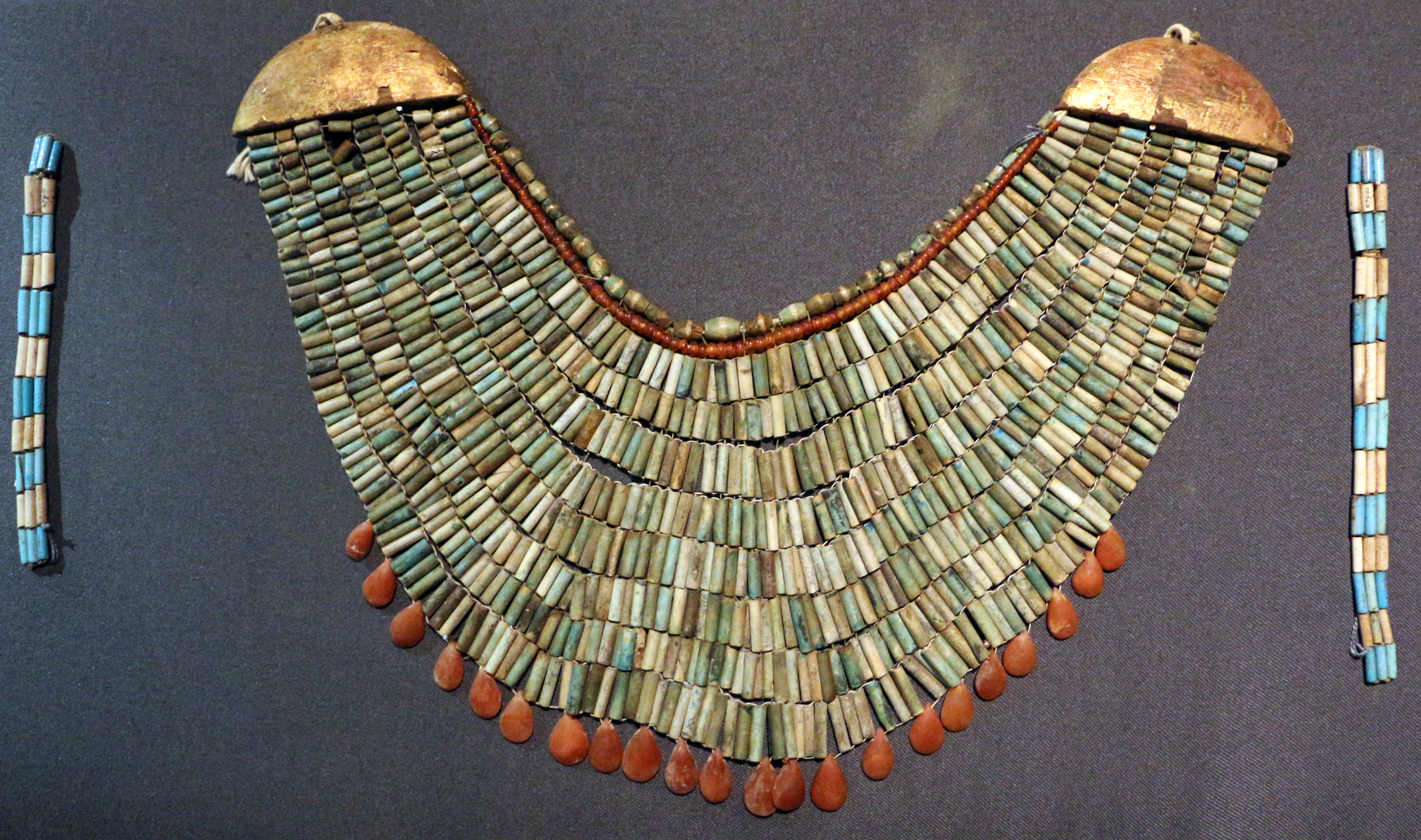
Necklace in blue and green faience

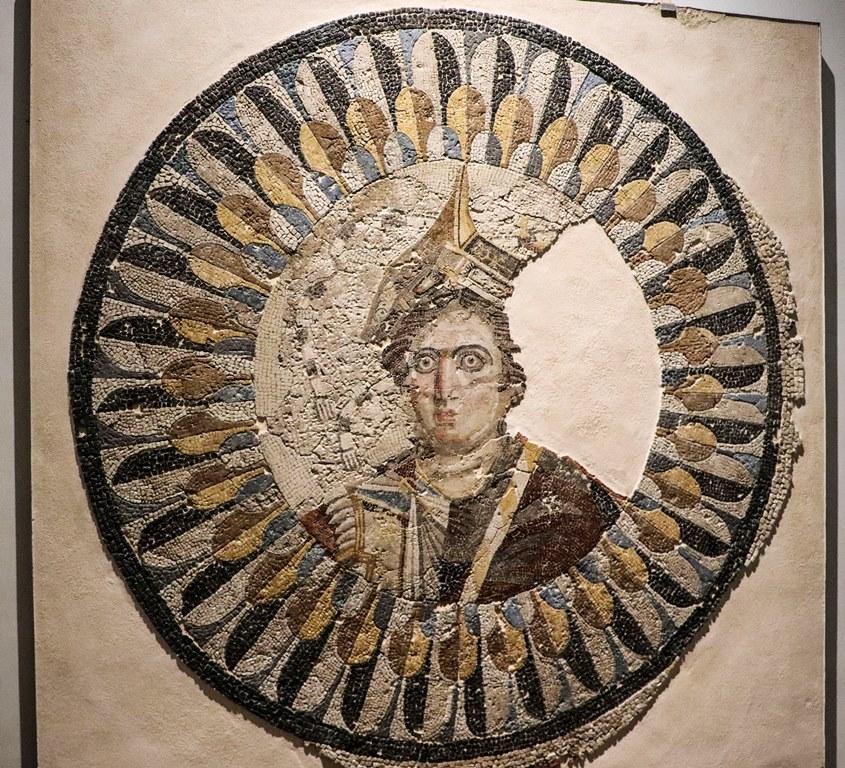
Mosaic portrait, representing Queen Berenice II, wife of Ptolemy III

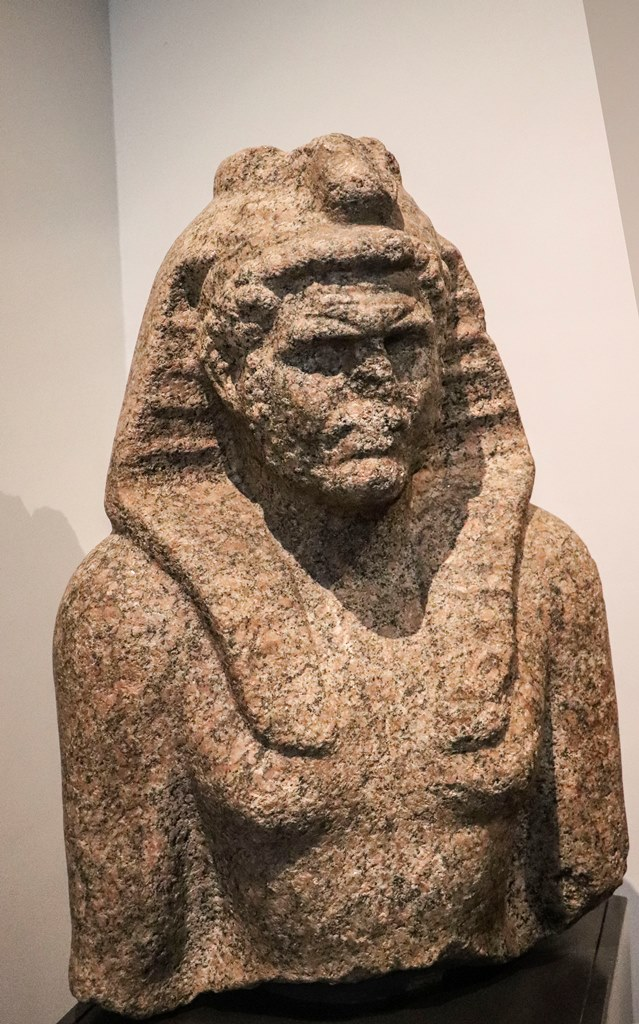
Bust of Roman Emperor Caracalla, wearing the pharaonic head-dress

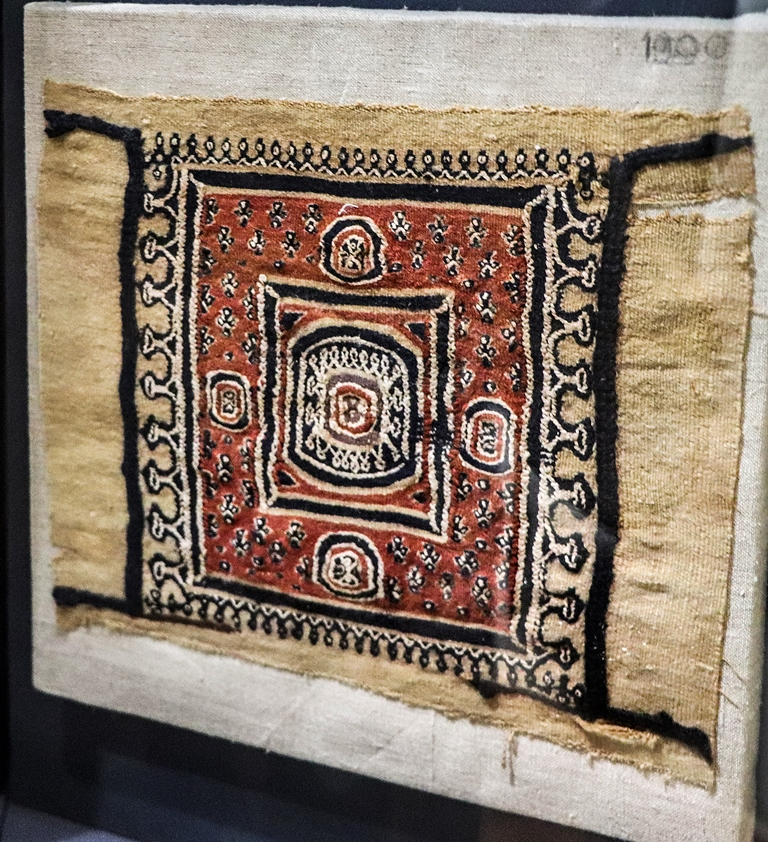
Piece of woolen and linen fabric 8th century

== See also ==
- List of museums in Egypt
- Museums in Alexandria
