= Egyptian Museum (Milan) =

Museum in Milan, Italy

Coordinates: 45°28′14″N 9°10′43″E

Egyptian Museum of Milan
- Museo Egizio di Milano
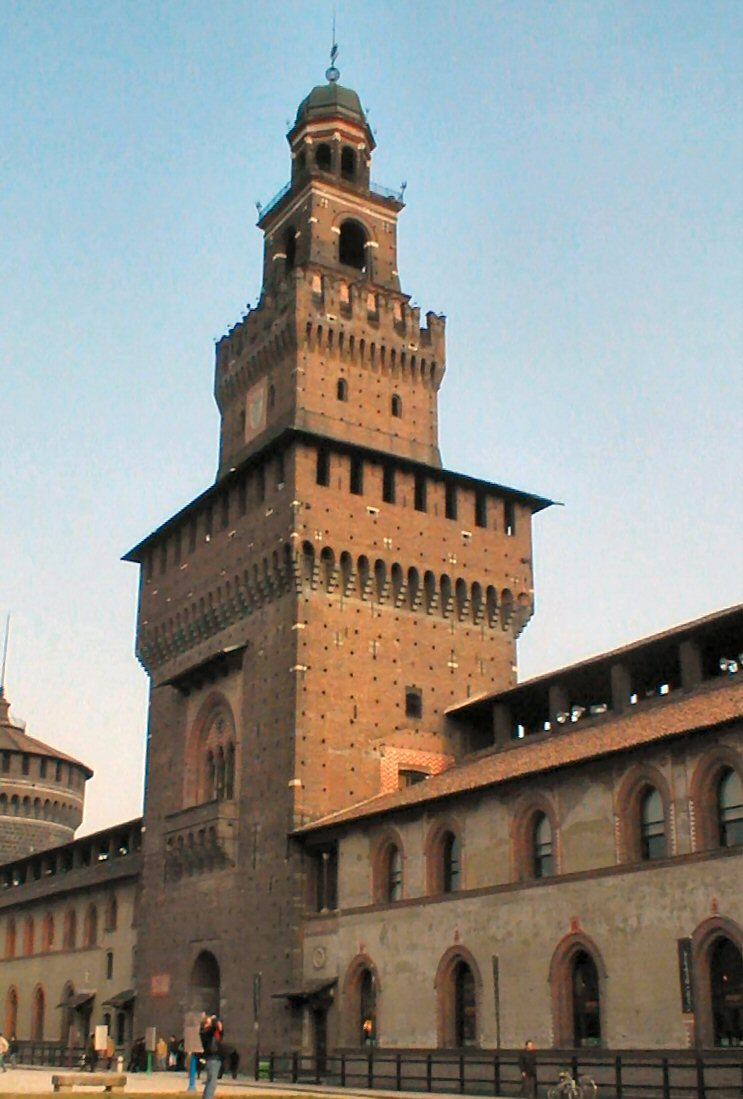
- Location: Piazza Castello 3, 20121, Milan, Italy
- Website: web.archive.org/web/20120626175202/http://www.milanocastello.it:80/ing/home.html

The Museo Egizio (Italian pronunciation: [muˈzɛːo eˈdʒittsjo]) or Egyptian Museum is a museum sited in the Sforza Castle of Milan, Italy. The Castle is one of the most famous monuments in Milan and is home to several museums including the Egyptian Section of the Milan Archaeological Museum, the Museum of Ancient Art, the Pinacoteca and the Museum of Musical Instruments.

== History ==
The first ancient Egyptian artefacts arrived in Milan in the 1820s. However, it was not until 1973 that they were displayed to the public in the city's first Egyptian museum. At the time, the Egyptian Museum of Milan was located in the basement of the Rocchetta courtyard inside the Sforza Castle.

Ownership of the exhibitions passed to the Municipality of Milan in 1900 and the collection expanded over time, thanks to donations from private collectors and excavations conducted in Egypt in the 1930s by Achille Vogliano. These excavations brought the number of artefacts on display to 3,000. Among the collections are noteworthy funerary objects belonging to Peftauajaset, as well as a bronze statue of Osiris.

Following a renovation of the exhibition space in 2003, the museum relocated to the Visconti rooms of the Sforza Castle. In 2021, the museum underwent further renovations, including the installation of multimedia displays and a new lighting system for the exhibits, as well as adaptations to eliminate architectural barriers.

After a nine-year closure, the museum reopened to the public on 5 March 2026.

== Exhibitions ==
The museum, situated in the underground level of the ducal courtyard, is divided into seven different sections:

- Ancient Egyptian writing
- Pharaohs
- Deities and cults
- Everyday ancient Egyptian life
- Funerary cult
- Excavations conducted by Achille Vogliano
- Mummies, sarcophagi and funerary masks

A mummy dating from the Greco-Roman period, from Thebes, and ancient Egyptian sarcophagi are exposed in the "mummies, sarcophagi and funerary mask" section, while some papyri of the Book of the Dead are exposed in the Funerary Cult section.

== Gallery ==
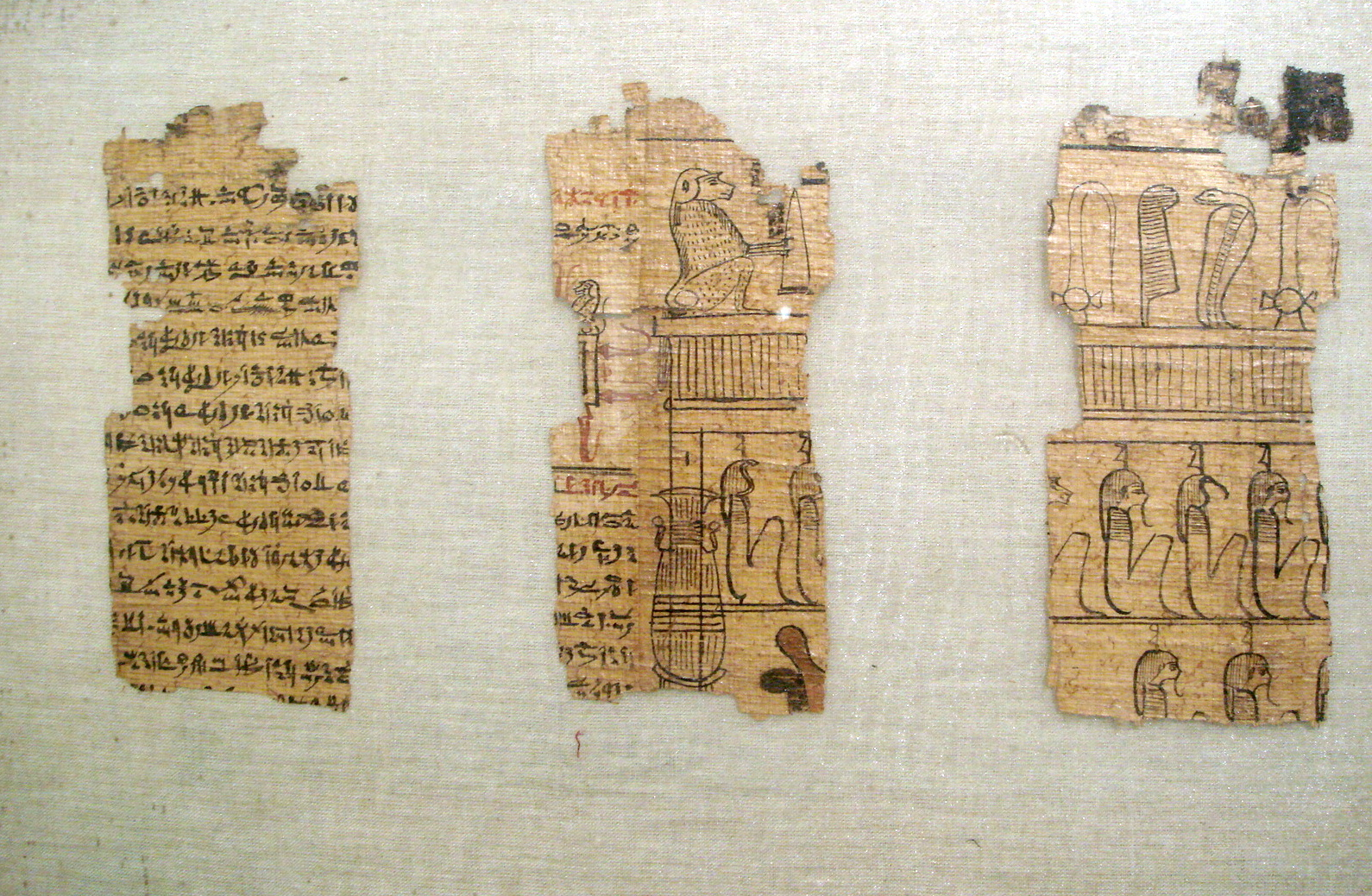
Fragments of the Book of the Dead preserved in the museum.

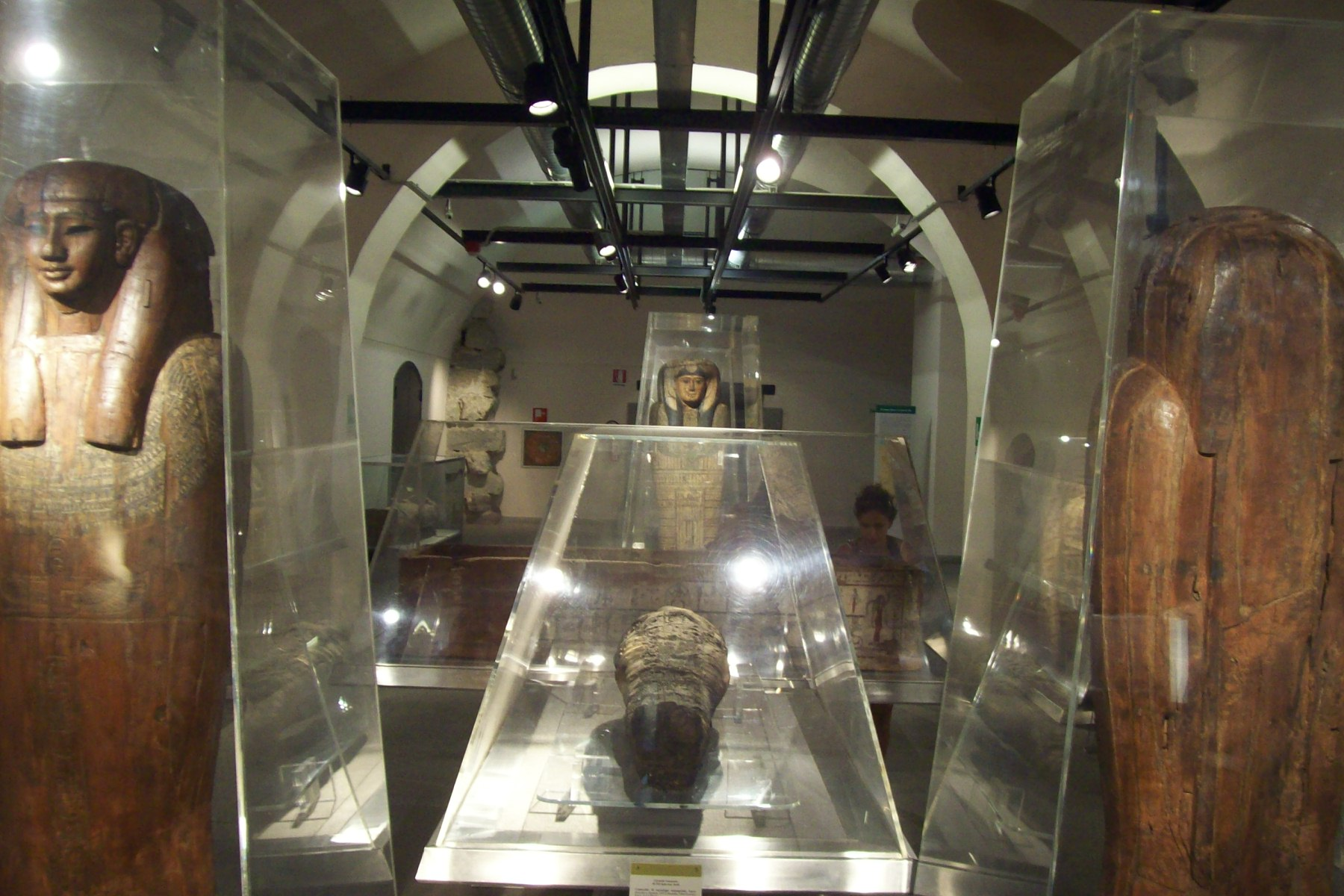
One of the mummies in the museum.

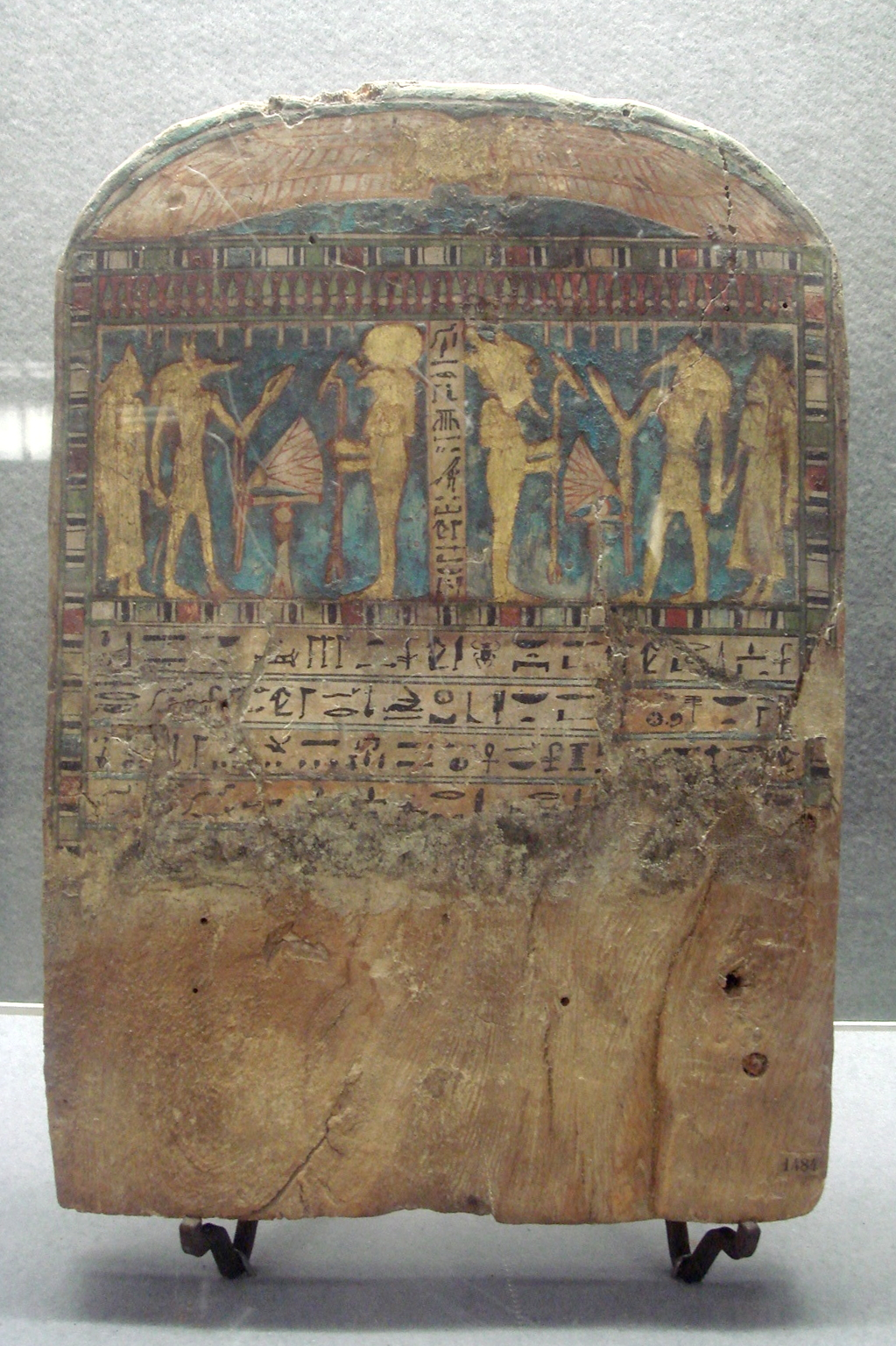
Funerary stele (7th-9th century BC).

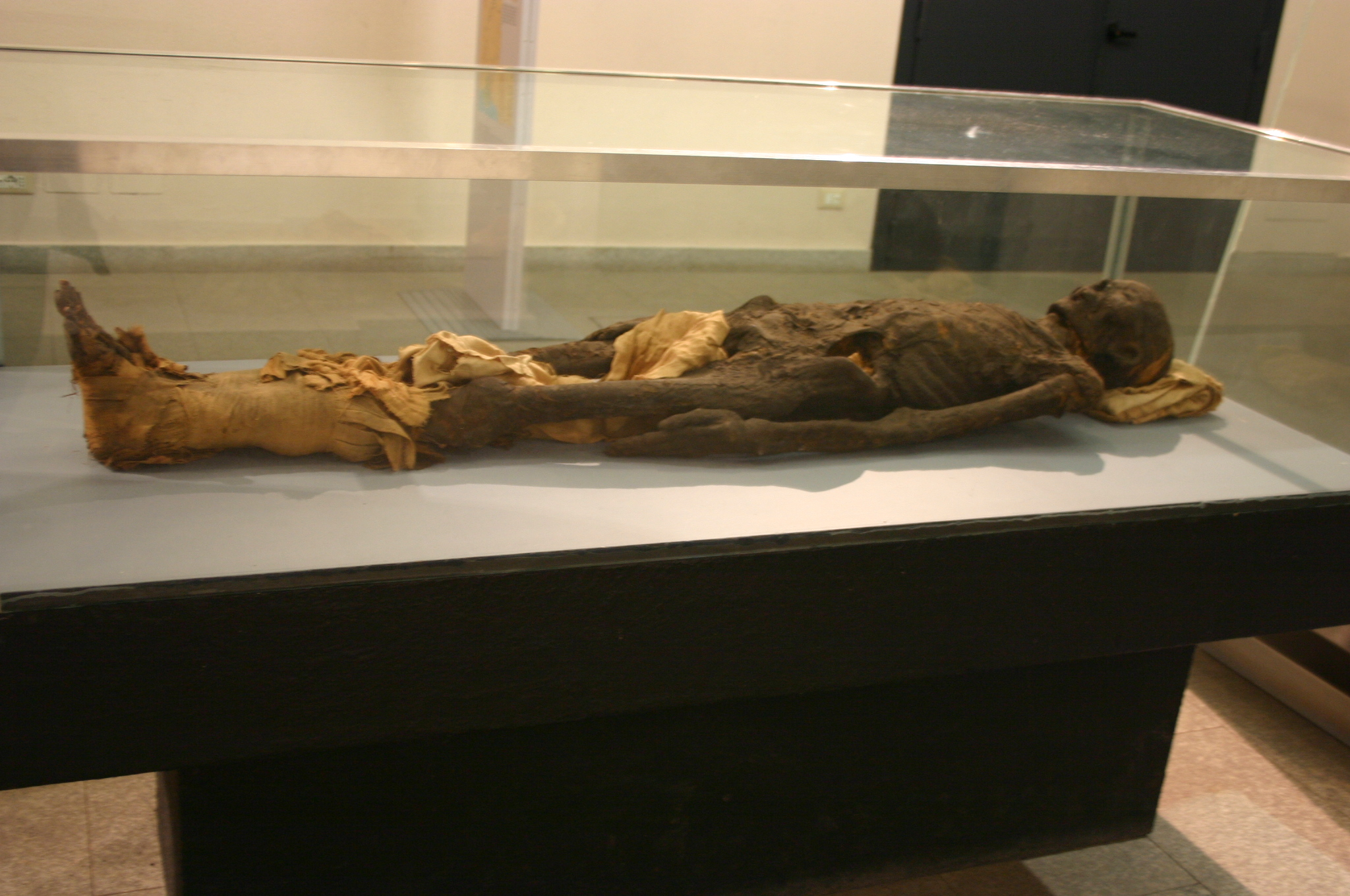
Mummy of Greek-Roman era, from Thebes.

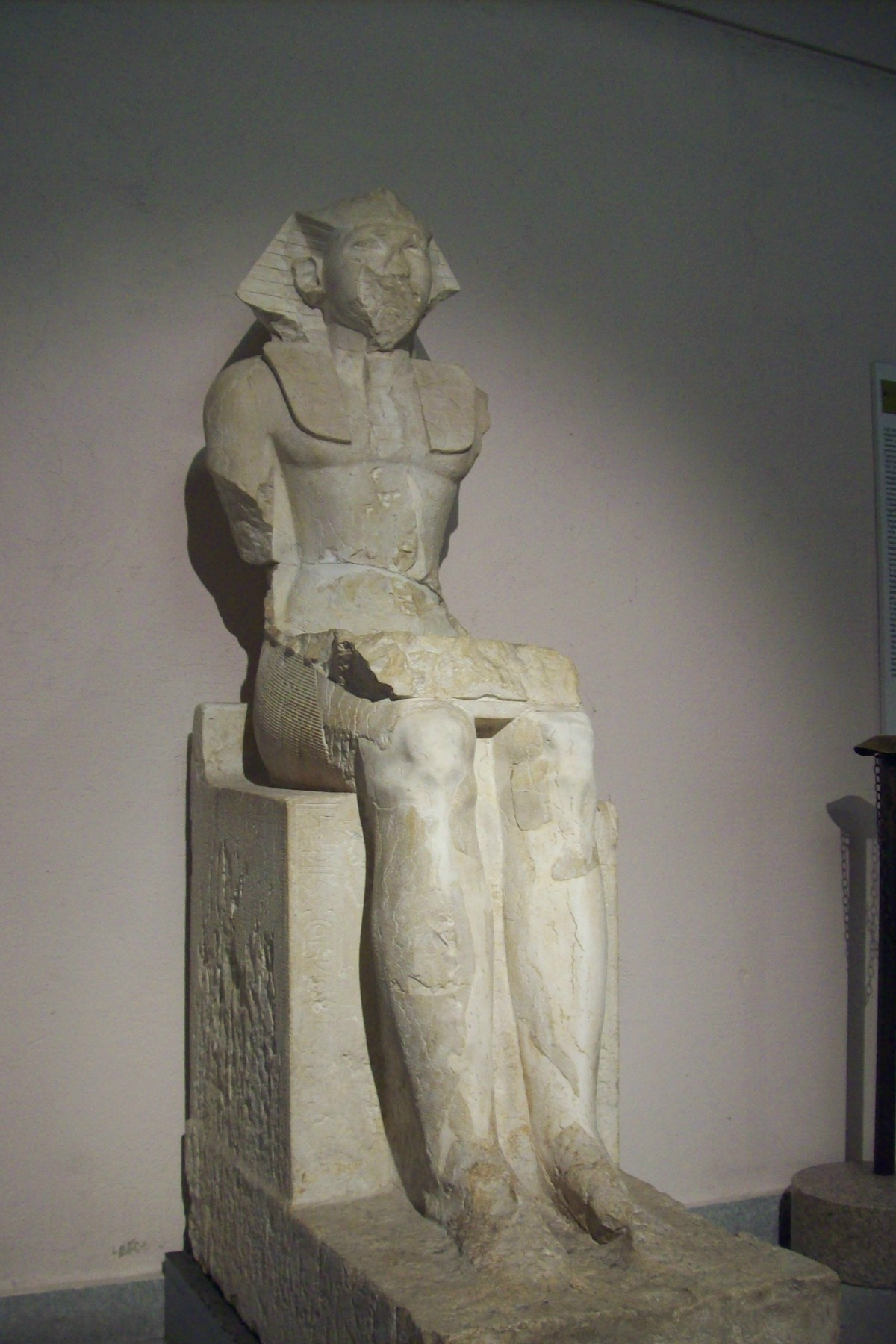
Amenemhat III (1842–1794 BC).

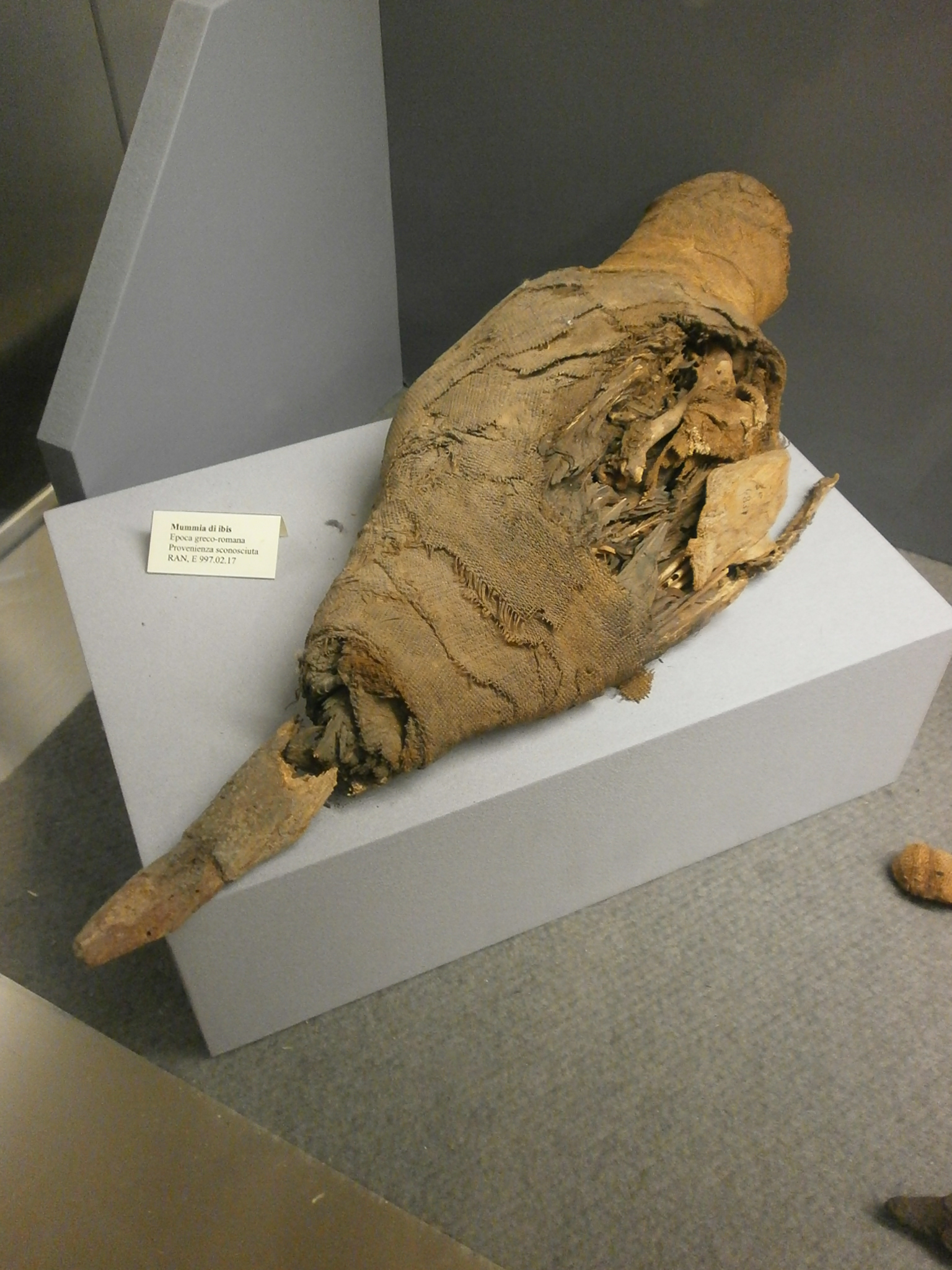
Ibis mummy, Greek-Roman era.

== See also ==
- List of museums of Egyptian antiquities

== Bibliography ==
- "The underground level of the Ducal courtyard: Egyptian section of the Archaeological Museum". milanocastello.it.
- Milano e provincia. Milan: Touring Club Italiano. 2003.
- Roberta D'Adda; Massimo Zanella, eds. (2008). Le città d'arte: Milano. Milan: Skira.
