= Opellia gens =

Ancient Roman family

The gens Opellia, also spelled Opelia and Opilia, was a minor family of imperial Rome, which briefly emerged from obscurity when Marcus Opellius Macrinus was proclaimed emperor following the murder of Caracalla in AD 217. The only members of this gens who appear in history are the emperor and his son, Marcus Opellius Diadumenianus, who ruled briefly as co-emperor in 218, but other Opellii are found in inscriptions, particularly from Dacia.

== Origin ==
The nomen Opellius seems to belong to a class of gentilicia formed from cognomina using the diminutive suffix -illius or -ellius. It might thus be related to similar nomina, such as Obellius or Ofilius. Most of the Opellii named in inscriptions cannot be precisely dated, but it may be significant that some of them are from Praeneste, an ancient Latin city, and perhaps the origin of the gens.

== Members ==
This list includes abbreviated praenomina. For an explanation of this practice, see filiation.

- Marcus Opellius Macrinus, emperor from AD 217 to 218. A native of Caesarea in the province of Mauretania Caesariensis, Macrinus was praetorian prefect during the reign of Caracalla, whose assassination he arranged. Despite the support of the senate and his popularity with the soldiers, he was overthrown and slain the following year in a rebellion led by members of the former imperial family.
- Marcus Opellius M. f. Diadumenianus, emperor with his father in 218, was said to have been a beautiful child, and was nine years old when he was associated with his father in the empire. He was captured by forces loyal to the soon-to-be emperor Elagabalus, and put to death shortly before his father.
- Opilia, wife of Visalus Prima, buried at Turgalium in Lusitania.
- Opilia C. f., named in an inscription from Praeneste in Latium.
- Gaius Opilius, named in an inscription from Rome, dating to AD 147.
- Marcus Opilius, named in an inscription from Noviomagus Lexoviorum in Gallia Lugdunensis.
- Publius Opelius, named in an inscription from Rome.
- Marcus Opellius Adiutor, duumvir of the colony of Brucla in Dacia.
- Marcus Opellius M. f. Adiutor, duumvir at Ulpia Trajana, the capital of Dacia.
- Opelia Calityche, buried at Ampelium in Dacia, aged sixty-eight.
- Marcus Opilius Crispinus, buried at Ampelium, aged four years, five months, and thirteen days.
- Opilius Dexter, a soldier stationed at Ostia in AD 168.
- Opilia Faustilla, buried at Rome, aged sixty-five.
- Marcus Opellius Felicissimus, buried at Ostia.
- Marcus Opilius Firminus, buried at Ampelium.
- Opilius Junius Aratus, buried at Ammaedara in Africa Proconsularis, aged fifty.
- Marcus Opellius Maximus, a municipal official at Aquae in Dacia.
- Opellia M. f. Secunda, buried at Verona in the province of Venetia et Histria.
- Marcus Opellius Secundus, named in a libationary inscription from Alba Julia in Dacia.
- Opellia Victorina, buried at Ampelum in Dacia, aged ten years, three months.
- Opilia Villu, named in an inscription from Praeneste.
- Gaius Opellius Zmaragdus, named in an inscription from Seleucia Pieria in Syria.

== See also ==
- List of Roman gentes

== Bibliography ==
- Lucius Cassius Dio Cocceianus (Cassius Dio), Roman History.
- Herodianus, History of the Empire from the Death of Marcus.
- Sextus Aurelius Victor, De Caesaribus (On the Caesars), Epitome de Caesaribus
- Eutropius, Breviarium Historiae Romanae (Abridgement of the History of Rome)..
- Aelius Lampridius, Aelius Spartianus, Flavius Vopiscus, Julius Capitolinus, Trebellius Pollio, and Vulcatius Gallicanus, Historia Augusta (Augustan History).
- Joannes Zonaras, Epitome Historiarum (Epitome of History).
- Dictionary of Greek and Roman Biography and Mythology, William Smith, ed., Little, Brown and Company, Boston (1849).
- Theodor Mommsen et alii, Corpus Inscriptionum Latinarum (The Body of Latin Inscriptions, abbreviated CIL), Berlin-Brandenburgische Akademie der Wissenschaften (1853–present).
- René Cagnat et alii, L'Année épigraphique (The Year in Epigraphy, abbreviated AE), Presses Universitaires de France (1888–present).
- George Davis Chase, "The Origin of Roman Praenomina", in Harvard Studies in Classical Philology, vol. VIII (1897).
- Inscriptiones Daciae Romanae (Inscriptions from Roman Dacia, abbreviated IDR), Bucharest (1975–present).
