= Palestrina, Lazio =

Palestrina
- Comune
- Comune di Palestrina
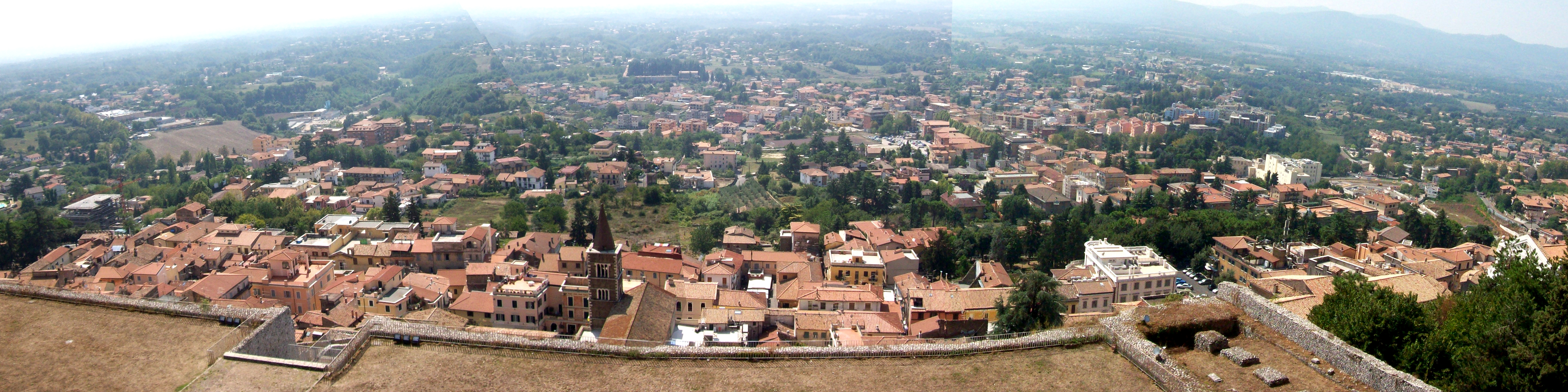

- Flag Coat of arms

- Location of Palestrina in the Metropolitan City of Rome Capital

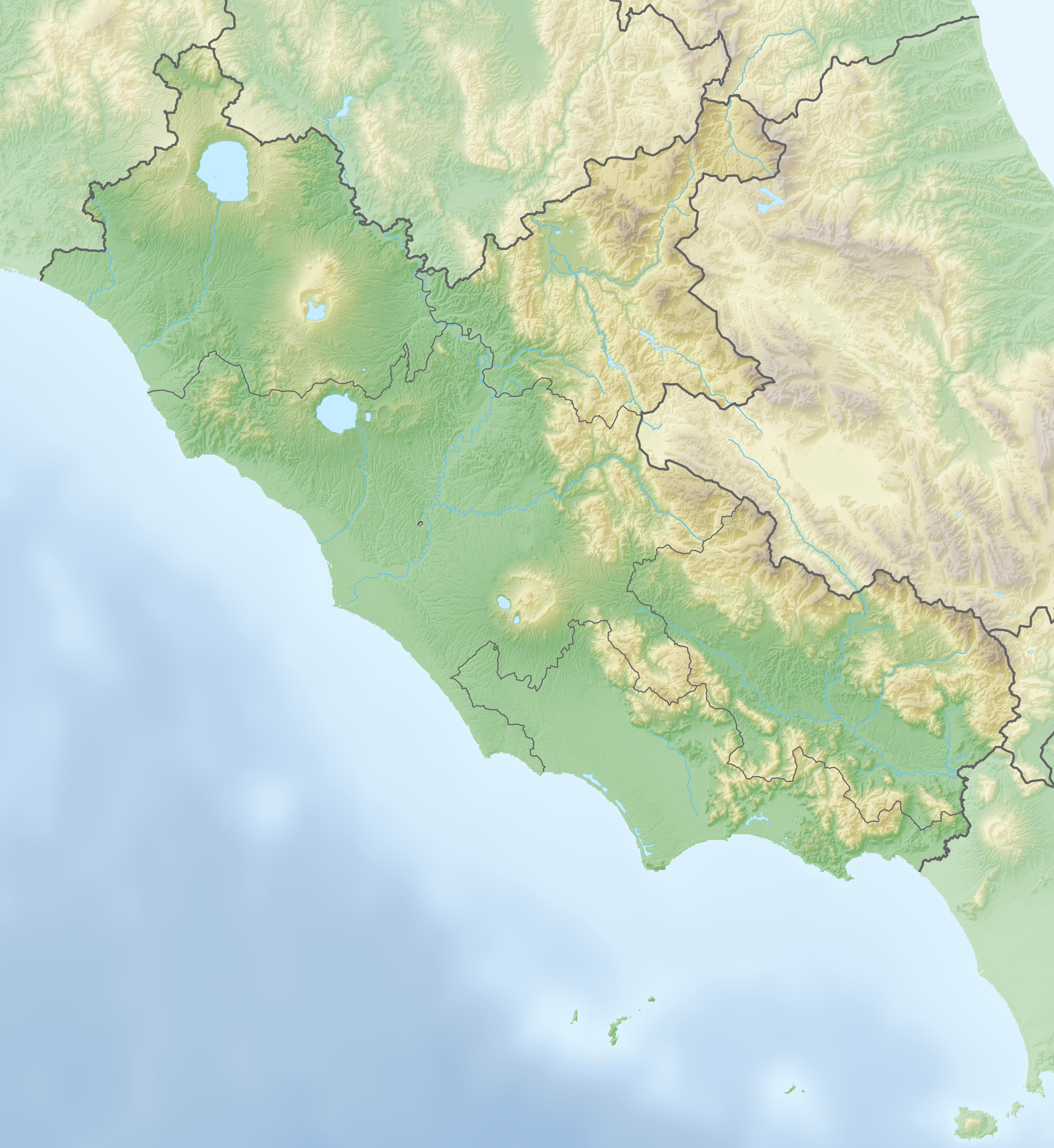
- Location within Lazio Location within Italy Location within European Union
- Coordinates: 41°50′N 12°54′E
- Country: Italy
- Region: Lazio
- Metropolitan city: Rome (RM)

Area
  - Total: 47.02 km^{2} (18.15 sq mi)
- Elevation: 450 m (1,480 ft)

Population (2018-01-01)
  - Total: 21,872
  - Density: 465.2/km^{2} (1,205/sq mi)
- Demonym: Palestrinesi o Prenestini
- Time zone: UTC+1 (CET)
  - Summer (DST): UTC+2 (CEST)
- Postal code: 00036 (capital, Valvarino), 00030 (Carchitti)
- Patron saint: St. Agapitus martyr
- Saint day: August 18
- Website: Official website

Palestrina (ancient Praeneste; Ancient Greek: Πραίνεστος, Praínestos) is a modern Italian city and comune (municipality) with a population of about 22,000, in Lazio, about 35 kilometres (22 miles) east of Rome. It is connected to the latter by the Via Prenestina. It is built upon the ruins of the ancient city of Praeneste.

Palestrina is the birthplace of composer Giovanni Pierluigi da Palestrina.

== Geography ==
Palestrina lies on the slopes of Monte Ginestro, one of the peaks of Prenestini Mountains (Monti Prenestini), a mountain range in the central Apennines.

Modern Palestrina borders the following municipalities: Artena, Castel San Pietro Romano, Cave, Gallicano nel Lazio, Labico, Rocca di Cave, Rocca Priora, Rome, San Cesareo, Valmontone, Zagarolo.

== History ==
Modern-day Palestrina stands on the site of ancient Praeneste, a Latin city renowned in antiquity for the sanctuary of Fortuna Primigenia built on a series of terraces on the slope of the hill on which the town stands. The topology of the sanctuary on artificial terraces was common in the Hellenistic period in central Italy. These Roman terraces supported the town of Praeneste. The ancient city, however, probably dates from an even earlier period from the 2nd century BC.

=== Ancient Praeneste ===
Ancient mythology connected the origin of Praeneste to Caeculus, or to other fabled characters such as Telegonus, Erulus or Praenestus. The name probably derives from the word Praenesteus, referring to its overlooking location.

The earliest archaeological evidence of human habitation in the area, specifically princely burials (the Barberini Tomb and the Bernardini Tomb), date back to the beginning of the 8th or 7th century BC. Excavations in the necropolis have shown that in the late 8th century BC (Orientalising Period) a major cultural advance took place with notable eastern imports and with a close relationship with Etruria; the princely 7th c. Barberini (excavated in 1855) and Bernardini tombs had contents of at least the same quality as those in the cemeteries of Etruscan Caere (Cerveteri).

Praeneste soon became one of the most powerful and wealthy of the Latin towns.

Of the objects found in the oldest graves dating from about the 7th century BC, the cups of silver and silver-gilt and most of the gold and amber jewellery are Phoenician (possibly Carthaginian), but the bronzes and some of the ivory articles seem to be of the Etruscan civilization.

The earliest settlement was probably a citadel on the top of the hill around which a cyclopean wall was built, some of which remains today. In addition two walls of the same date and also visible today descended the slopes down to the town where a cross wall along the lower part of the sanctuary completed the circuit.

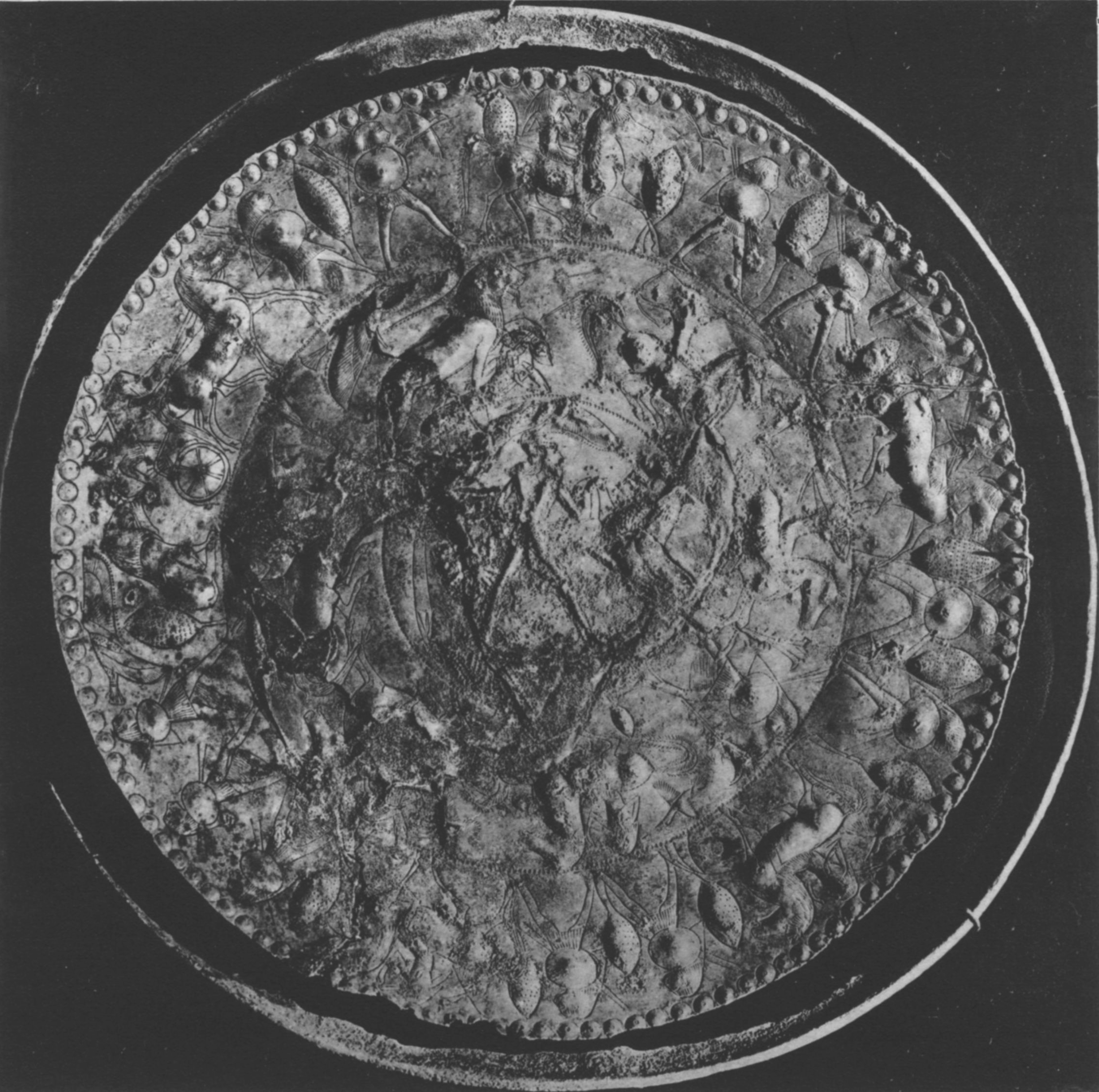
Phoenician bronze bowl, Barberini tomb (Villa Giulia museum)

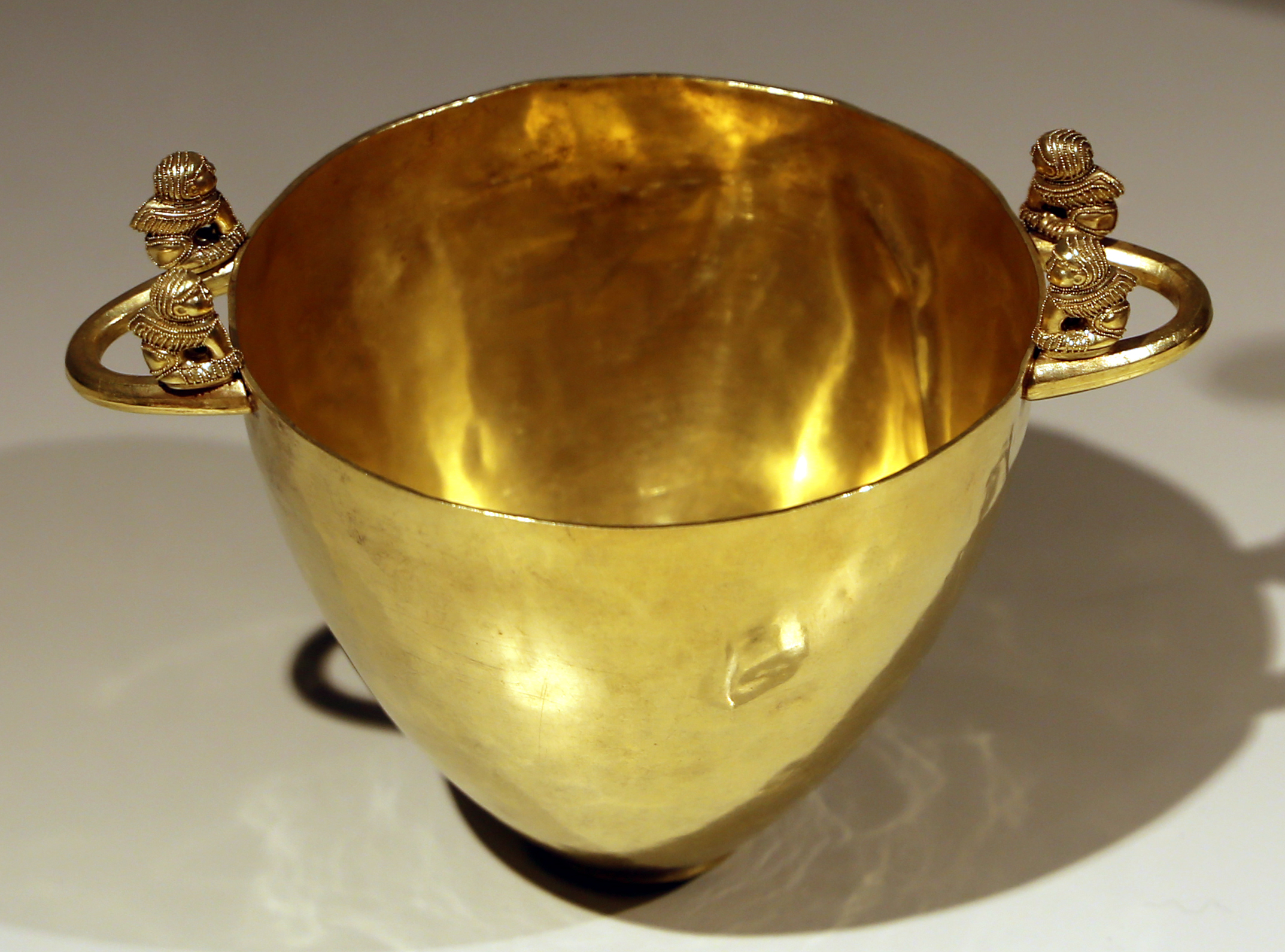
Kotyle from Bernardini tomb 675-650 BC (Villa Giulia museum)

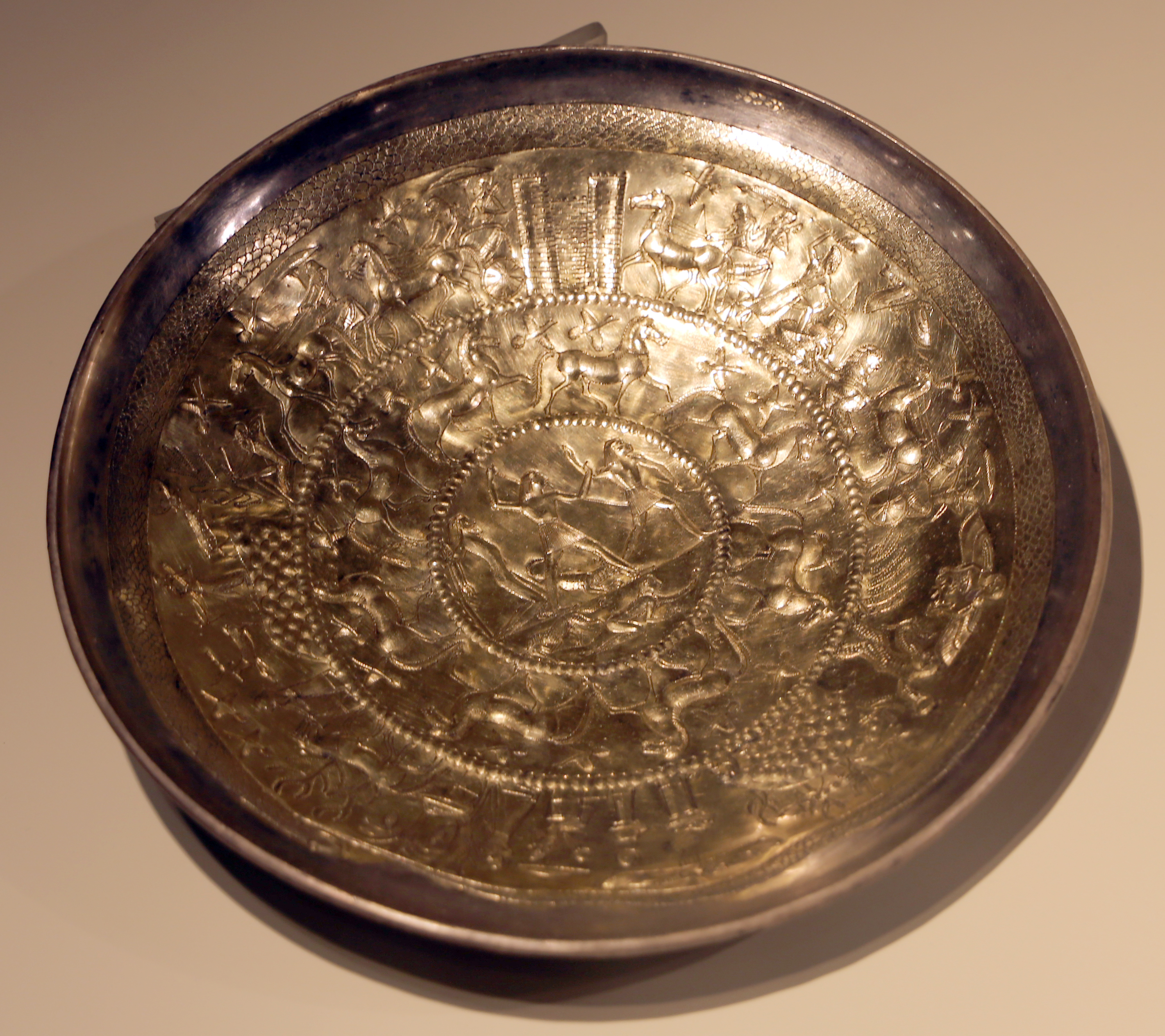
Phoenician silver plate, Bernardini tomb 675-650 BC (Villa Giulia museum)

==== Roman gentes with origins in Praeneste ====
- Anicia gens
- Caecilia gens
- Opellia gens
- Selicia gens

=== Latin League ===
Præneste was already a rich and prosperous town when Rome was still emerging. The rapid development of the Latin towns led to the formation of Latin League from the 8th c. BC for protection against the Etruscans and enemies from surrounding areas, and eventually brought Rome and Præneste together with the others. But Præneste because of her history and wealth felt superior to the others and became Rome's most hated rival as Rome grew rapidly.

=== Latin wars ===
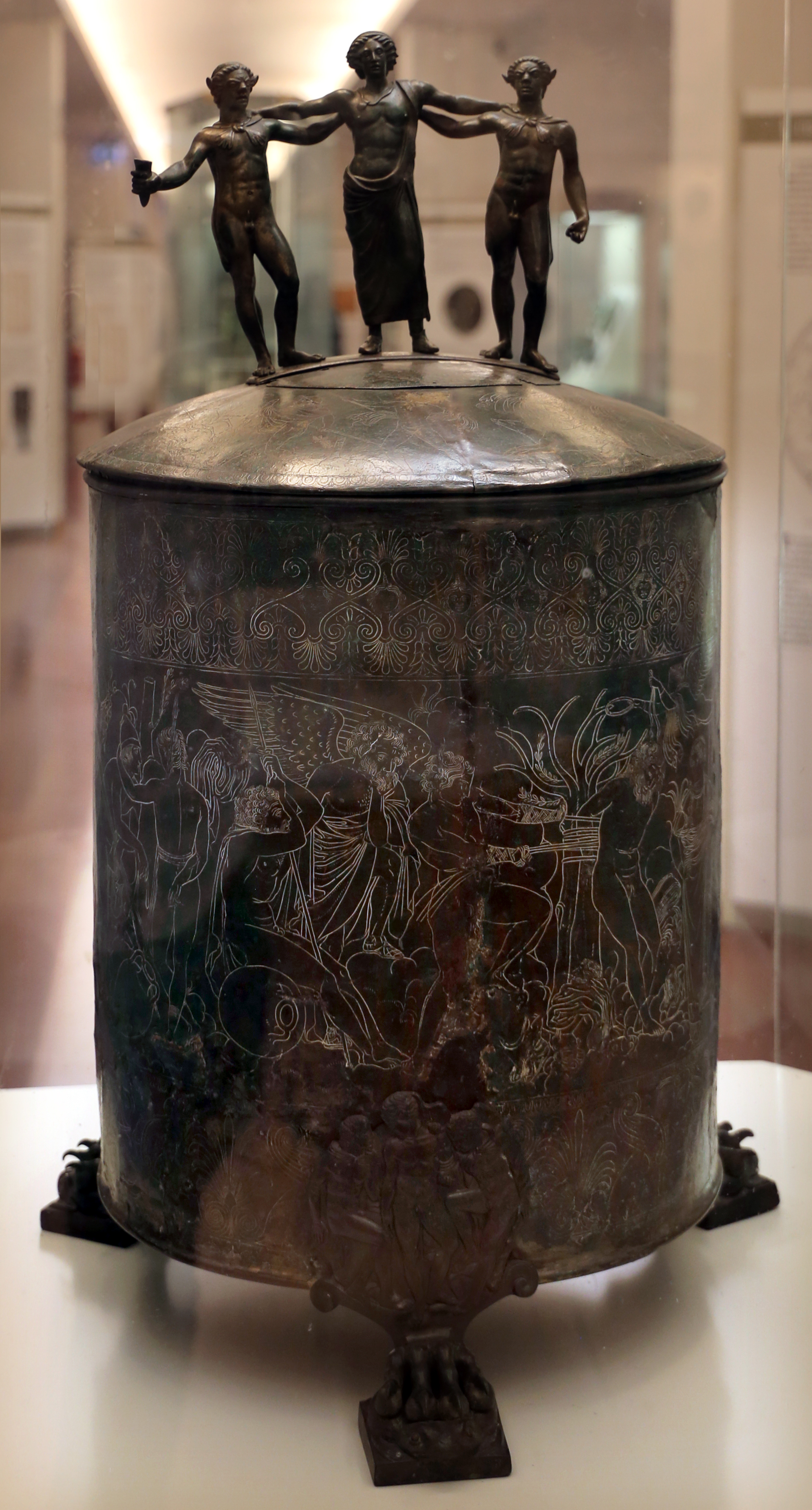
Ficoroni Cista from Praeneste, 4th c. BC, Villa Giulia museum, Rome

Praeneste withdrew from the Latin League in 499 BC, according to Livy (its earliest historical mention), and formed an alliance with Rome after which they won the Battle of Lake Regillus against thirty Latin states. After Rome was weakened by the Gauls of Brennus (390 BC), Praeneste switched allegiances to stem Roman expansion into Latium and establish power for itself and fought against Rome in the long struggles that culminated in the Latin War. From 373 to 370, it was in continual war against Rome or its allies, and was defeated by Cincinnatus.

Praeneste had made a treaty with Rome whereby it retained its own citizenship and Latin status but was required to provide troops to fight in the Roman Republic’s wars. In the Latin War of 340-338 BC, Praeneste was conquered by Rome and its allies in the Latin League, after putting up a strenuous resistance during which it had formed an anti-Roman alliance with the Gauls. In 90BC, the citizens of Praeneste were granted Roman citizenship. It became a city allied to Rome (foedus aequum) but equal, permitting Roman exiles to live there, which made the city more prosperous.

Dating to this period are tombs from which come the famous bronze boxes (cistae) and hand mirrors, some with inscriptions partly in Etruscan, among which is the famous bronze Ficoroni Cista (350-330 BC) (Museo Nazionale Etrusco di Villa Giulia, Rome) found in 1738. It is masterfully engraved with pictures of the arrival of the Argonauts in Bithynia and the victory of Pollux over Amycus. The inscription on it is in archaic Latin:Novios Plautios Romai med fecid / Dindia Macolnia fileai dedit ("Novios Plautios made me in Rome, Dindia Macolnia gave me to her daughter"). The caskets are unique in Italy, but a large number of mirrors of precisely similar style have been discovered in Etruria. Hence, although such objects may have come from Etruria, the evidence points decisively to an Etruscan factory in or near Praeneste itself. Other imported objects in the burials show that Praeneste traded not only with Etruria but also with the Greek east.

=== Republican Rome ===
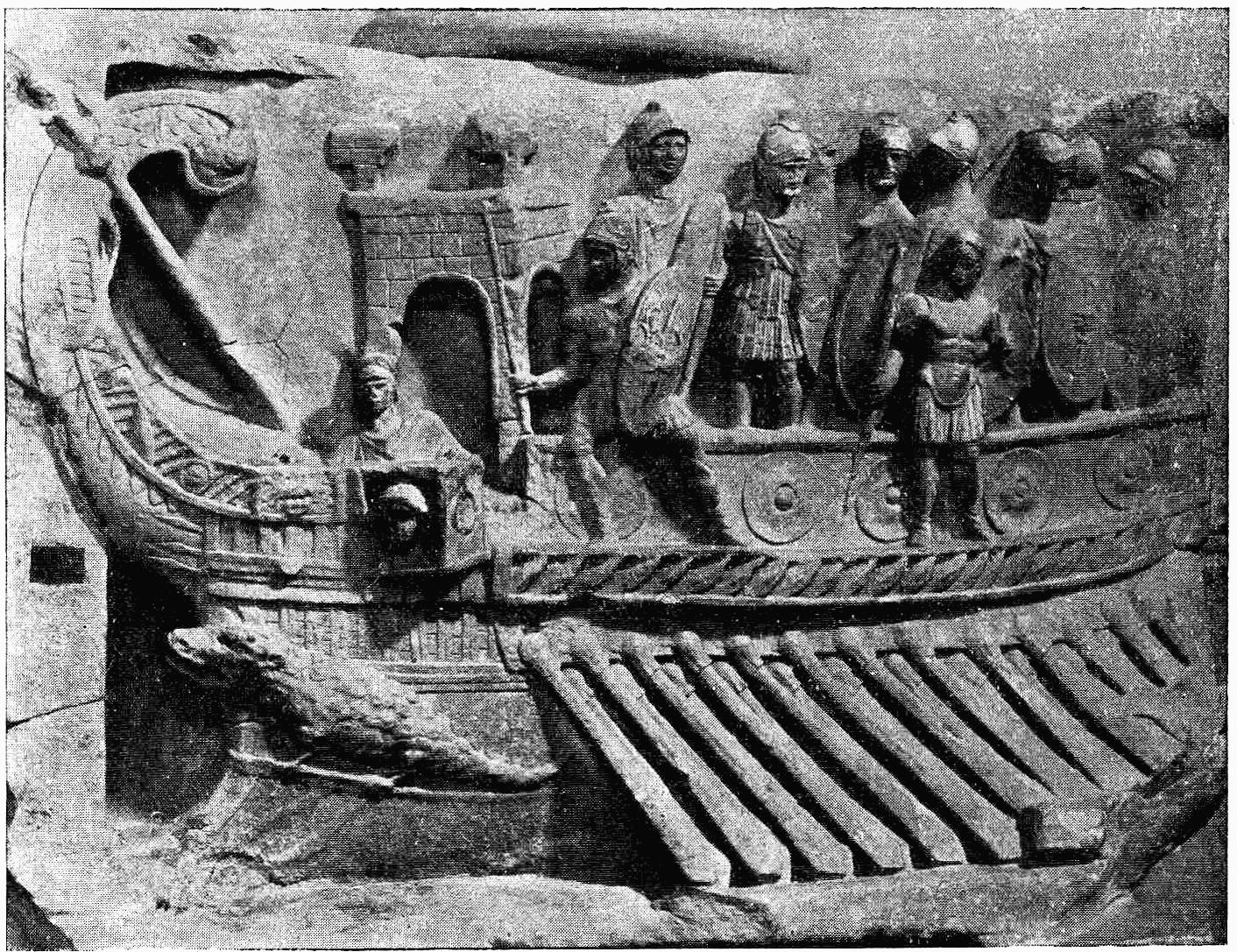
A Roman naval bireme in a relief from the Temple of Fortuna Primigenia (Museo Pio-Clementino, Vatican Museums)

Praenestine graves from about 240 BC onwards are surmounted by the characteristic cippus made of local stone, containing stone coffins with rich bronze, ivory and gold ornaments beside the skeleton.

Præneste was linked to Rome by the major Via Praenestina Roman Road, which passed below the city, as an extension of the Via Gabiana.

From the middle of the 2nd century BC the city developed and extended intensively across the lower plateau beneath the slopes of the ancient city, even expanding beyond the valleys that border it and up to the edges of the vast necropolises. The buildings were predominantly in opus incertum. Among the public buildings here was the first thermal baths of "Madonna dell'Aquila".

At the end of the 2nd century BC a grandiose urban renovation project involved the entire city including at least 9 levels of terraces, including on the lower slope massive tuff terrace walls one of which was flanked by a street paved with limestone slabs, now the Via del Sole. The monumental sanctuary of Fortuna was also built at this time (around 120 BC), dominating the city and dwarfing all other buildings not only there, but even those in Rome.

An undertaking of this magnitude that required massive excavations and enormous landfills, drainage and canalisation works, the construction of terrace walls, elaborate sacred and public buildings took a long time, even with the slave labour force. Inscriptions with names of numerous magistrates involved in the project indicate its long duration.

Praeneste was offered Roman citizenship in 90 BC in the Social War, when concessions had to be made by Rome to cement necessary alliances and the town was made a municipium. Soon afterwards in Sulla's civil war, Gaius Marius the Younger was blockaded in the town by the forces of Sulla (82 BC). When the city was captured, Marius slew himself, the male inhabitants were massacred in cold blood, and a military colony was settled on part of its territory. From an inscription it appears that Sulla delegated the foundation of the new colony to Marcus Terentius Varro Lucullus (consul in 73 BC).

The founding of the colonia militare was probably preceded by proscriptions and a series of property confiscations. During the 1st century BC new domus were built but above all, earlier ones were renovated, likely belonging to the "Mariae" killed by Sulla. Larger domus were built featuring peristyles and frescoed rooms with mosaic floors, with widespread use of opus reticulatum in tuff, often combined with bricks in the wall courses and columns, which gradually replaced the opus incertum in limestone.

From the late Republic to the late Empire, markets, baths, shrines and perhaps even a second forum were built in the lower city, near today's Madonna dell'Aquila.

=== The Empire ===
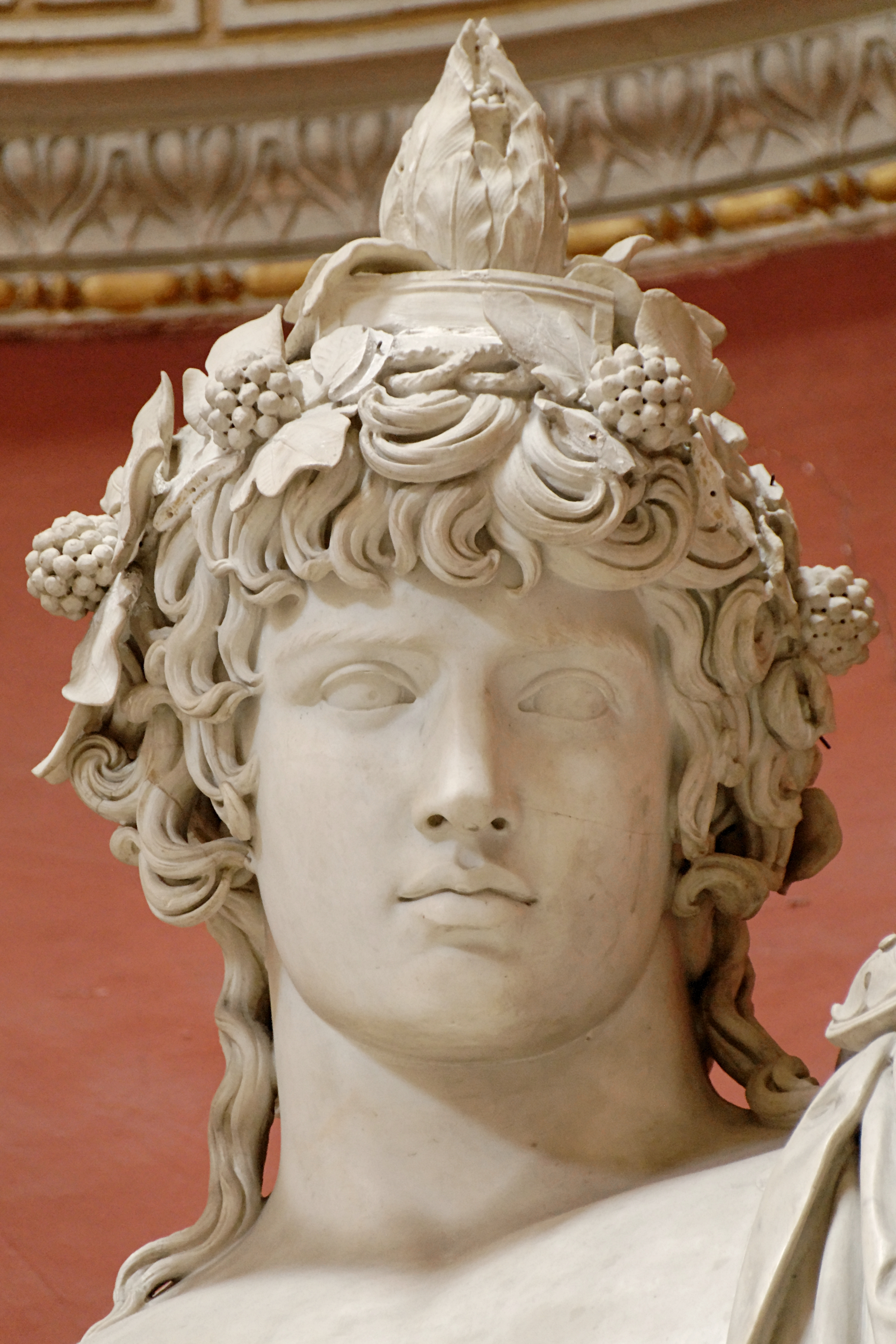
Braschi Antinous from the villa "of Hadrian", Vatican Museums

Under the Empire the cool breezes of Praeneste made it a favourite summer resort of wealthy Romans, whose villas studded the neighbourhood, though they ridiculed the language and the rough manners of the native inhabitants. The poet Horace ranked "cool Praeneste" with Tibur and Baiae as favoured resorts. The emperor Augustus stayed in Praeneste, and Tiberius recovered there from a dangerous illness and made it a municipium. The emperor Marcus Aurelius was at Praeneste with his family when his 7-year-old son Verus died. The ruins of the imperial villa associated with Hadrian stand on the plain near the church of S. Maria della Villa, about three-quarters of a mile from the town. At the site was discovered the statue of the Braschi Antinous, now in the Vatican Museums. Gaius Appuleius Diocles (104 – after 146 AD), a Roman charioteer from Lamego in Lusitania (modern-day Portugal) who became one of the most celebrated athletes in ancient history and is often cited as the highest-paid athlete of all time, was living in Praeneste after his retirement and died there. Pliny the Younger also had a villa at Praeneste, and L. Aurelius Avianius Symmachus retired there.

Inscriptions show that the inhabitants of Praeneste were fond of gladiatorial shows.

=== Medieval history ===
The modern town is built on the ruins of the temple of Fortuna Primigenia. A bishop of Praeneste is first mentioned in 313.

In 1297 the Colonna family, which had owned Praeneste (then known as Palestrina) from the eleventh century as a fief, revolted against Pope Boniface VIII. In the following year the town was taken by Boniface's Papal forces, razed to the ground and salted by order of the pontiff.

In 1437 the rebuilt city was captured by Giovanni Vitelleschi, a condottiero in the service of the papacy, and once more utterly destroyed at the command of Pope Eugenius IV. It was rebuilt once more and fortified by Stefano Colonna in 1448. During the Italian War of 1551-1559, Spanish troops under the Duke of Alba invaded Palestrina in 1556.

=== Barberini Family ===
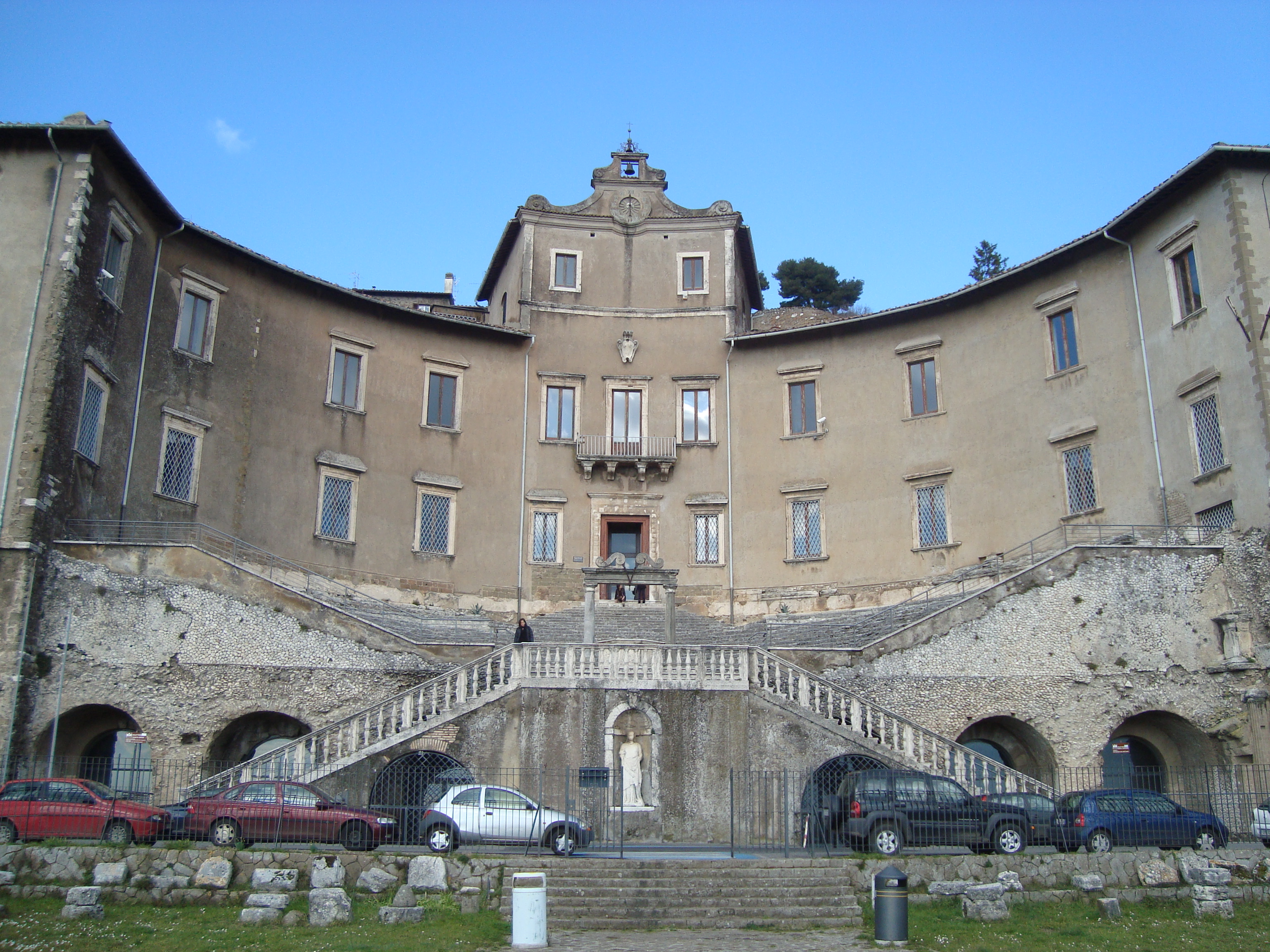
Barberini Palace

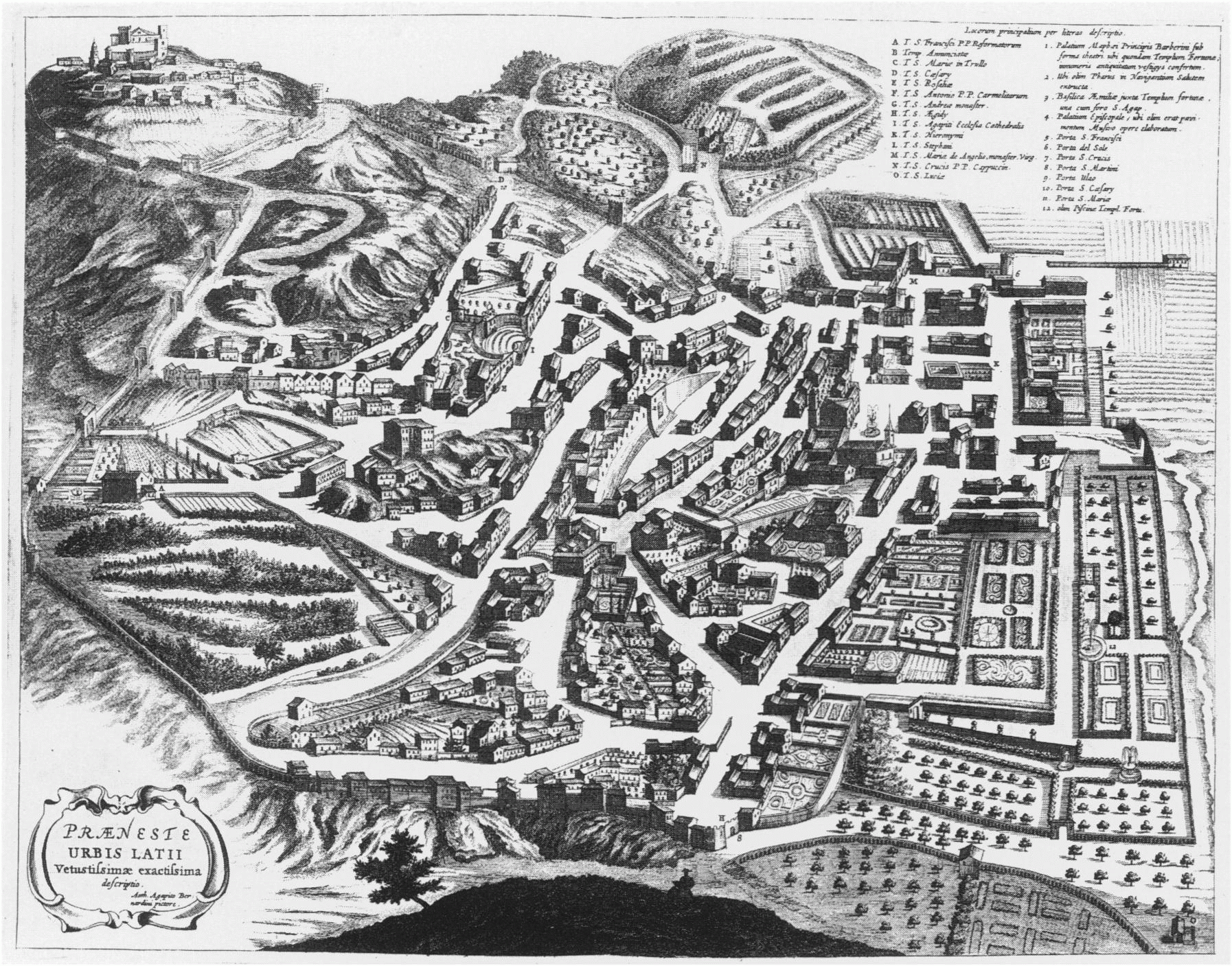
Palestrina as it appeared in 1671 during Barberini administration

In 1630, the comune passed by purchase into the Barberini family. It is likely the transfer was included as one of the conditions of the marriage of Taddeo Barberini and Anna Colonna. Thereafter, the famously nepotistic family, headed by Maffeo Barberini (later Pope Urban VIII), treated the comune as a principality in its own right.

Patriarchs of the Barberini family conferred, on various family members, the title of Prince of Palestrina. During the reign of Urban VIII, the title became interchangeable with that of Commander of the Papal Army (Gonfalonier of the Church) as the Barberini family controlled the papacy and the Palestrina principality.

The Wars of Castro ended (while Taddeo Barberini held both titles) and members of the Barberini family (including Taddeo) fled into exile after the newly elected Pope Innocent X launched an investigation into members of the Barberini family. Later the Barberini reconciled with the papacy when Pope Innocent X elevated Taddeo's son, Carlo Barberini to the cardinalate and his brother Maffeo Barberini married a niece of the Pope and reclaimed the title Prince of Palestrina.

Two members of the Barberini family were named Cardinal-Bishop of the Diocese of Palestrina: Antonio Barberini and Francesco Barberini (Junior), the son of Maffeo Barberini.

The Barberini Palace originally included the Nile mosaic of Palestrina.

=== Modern history ===
On 9 May 1849, Giuseppe Garibaldi achieved a decisive victory over the Neapolitan army (forces of Ferdinand II of the Two Sicilies) at the Battle of Palestrina, a key engagement in the defence of the Roman Republic.

In 1944, the historic centre of the city was destroyed by Allied bombings during World War II. The destruction of the buildings revealed the ancient remains of the Roman sanctuary to light.

== Description of Praeneste ==
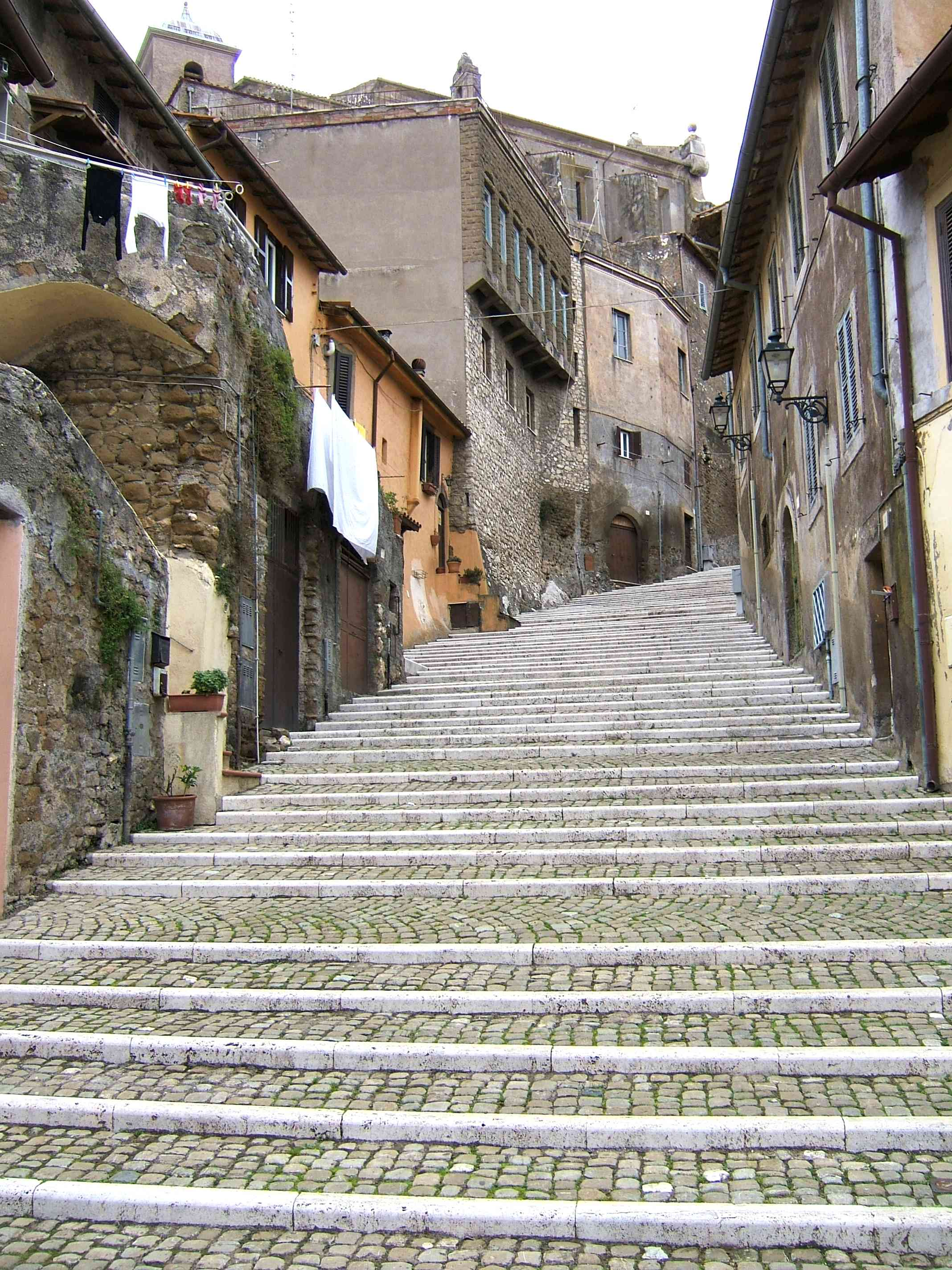
An old street in the city

The modern town of Palestrina stands on the site of ancient Praeneste, a Latin city renowned in antiquity for the Sanctuary of Fortuna Primigenia – a sanctuary dedicated to the goddess Fortuna Primigenia. The town came to largely obscure the sanctuary, the monumental remains of which were revealed as a result of American bombing of German positions in World War II.

=== Sanctuary of Fortuna Primigenia ===
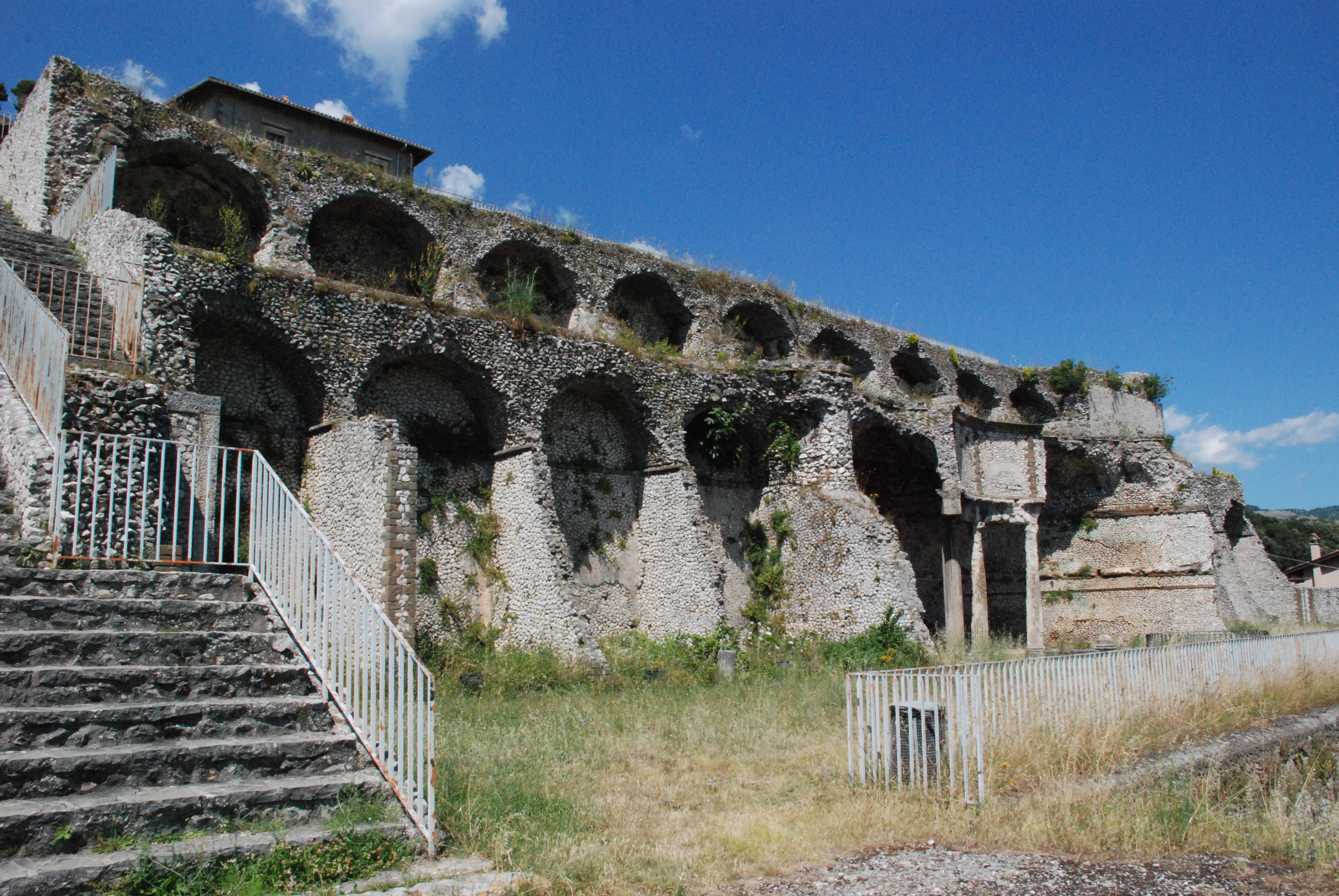
Terrace of Sanctuary of Fortuna Primigenia

Praeneste was chiefly famed for its great Temple of Fortuna Primigenia connected with the oracle known as the Praenestine lots (sortes praenestinae).

=== Forum and Basilica ===
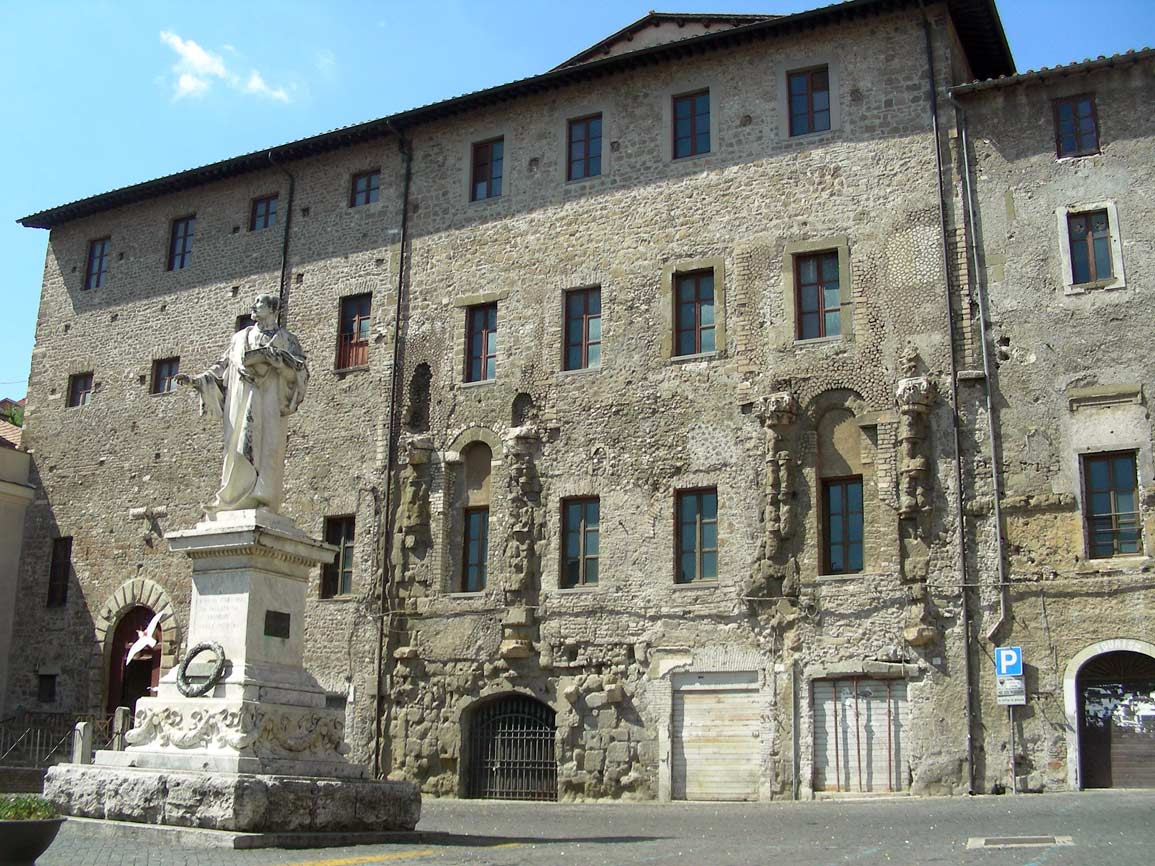
Facade of the apsidal hall in the piazza Regina Margherita

Archaeologists working in the 1950s were able to identify the area around the Cathedral and the Piazza Regina Margherita as the original Forum of Ancient Praeneste. The buildings of the forum comprised a central temple, whose walls were re-used for the cathedral, and a two-storey civil basilica consisting of four naves separated by columns, once roofed but today an open space. Its façade included a sundial described by Varro, traces of which may still be seen.

The basilica was flanked by two buildings, the easternmost apsidal hall containing a raised podium (suggestus) and the public treasury, the aerarium, identified by an inscription dating it to ~150 BC. At some later date (perhaps around 110-100 BC), these two buildings were each embellished with a wonderful nymphaeum and a magnificent mosaic floor.

The western nymphaeum is a natural cave enlarged and enriched through three niches, while its roof was embellished with artificial stalactites. A huge arch made of limestone blocks creates a monumental entrance, whilst the space in front of it is paved with an extremely fine white mosaic. The main mosaic represents a seascape: a temple of Poseidon on the shore characterised by an altar and a high column. The latter is topped by a big metal vase and decorated by two shields; next to it are a trident and a rudder. There are colourful and realistic fish of all kinds, crustaceans and molluscs swimming in the sea.

The eastern nymphaeum was decorated with the spectacular Nile mosaic of Palestrina with scenes from the Egyptian river, now relaid in the Palazzo Colonna Barberini in Palestrina on the uppermost terrace (now the National Archaeological Museum of Palestrina).

These mosaics were enriched with a veil of water from the nymphaea, enhancing the colours of the depiction. It is thought they were realised by artists from Alexandria at the end of the 2nd century BC.

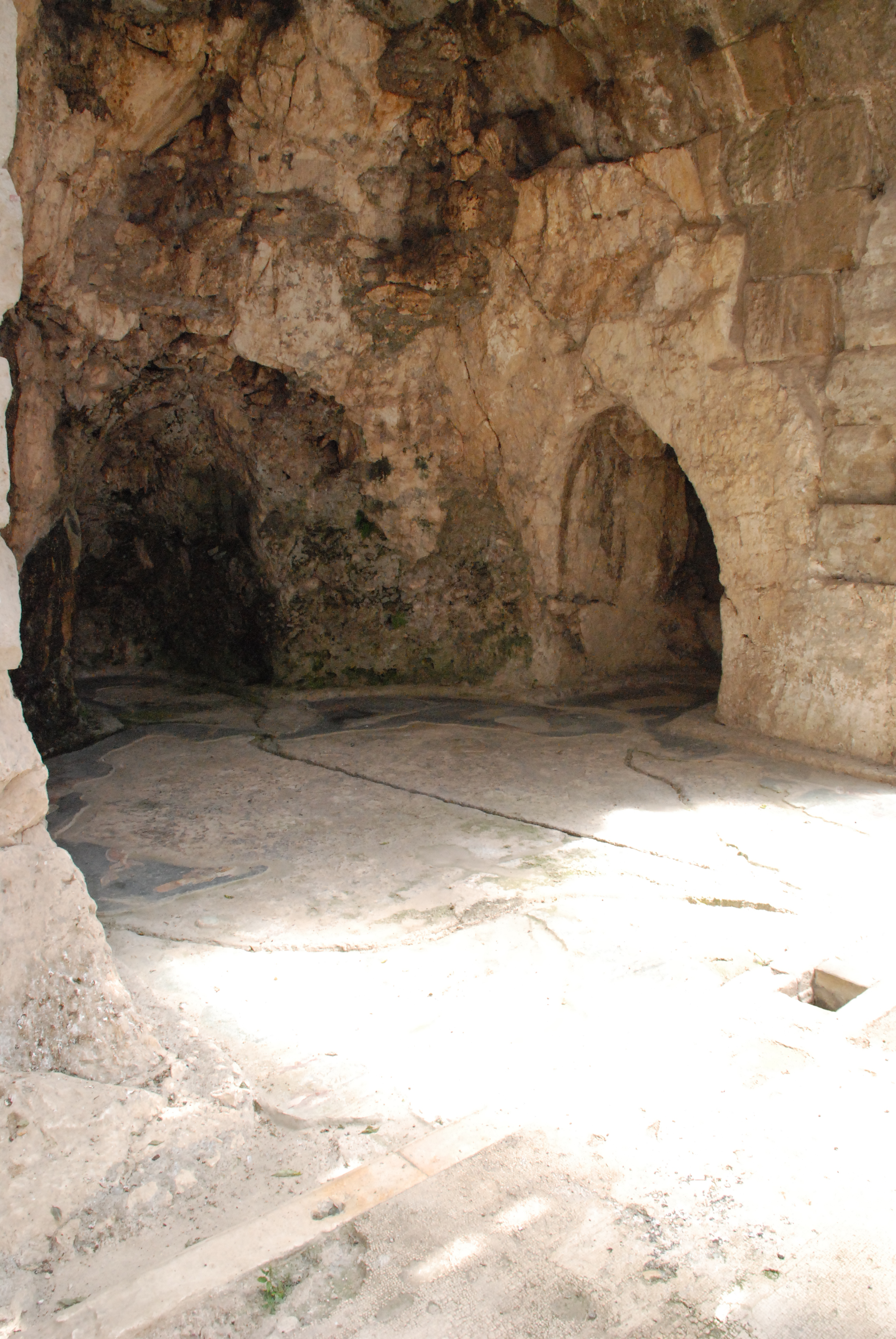
Nymphaeum and Mosaic of Fish

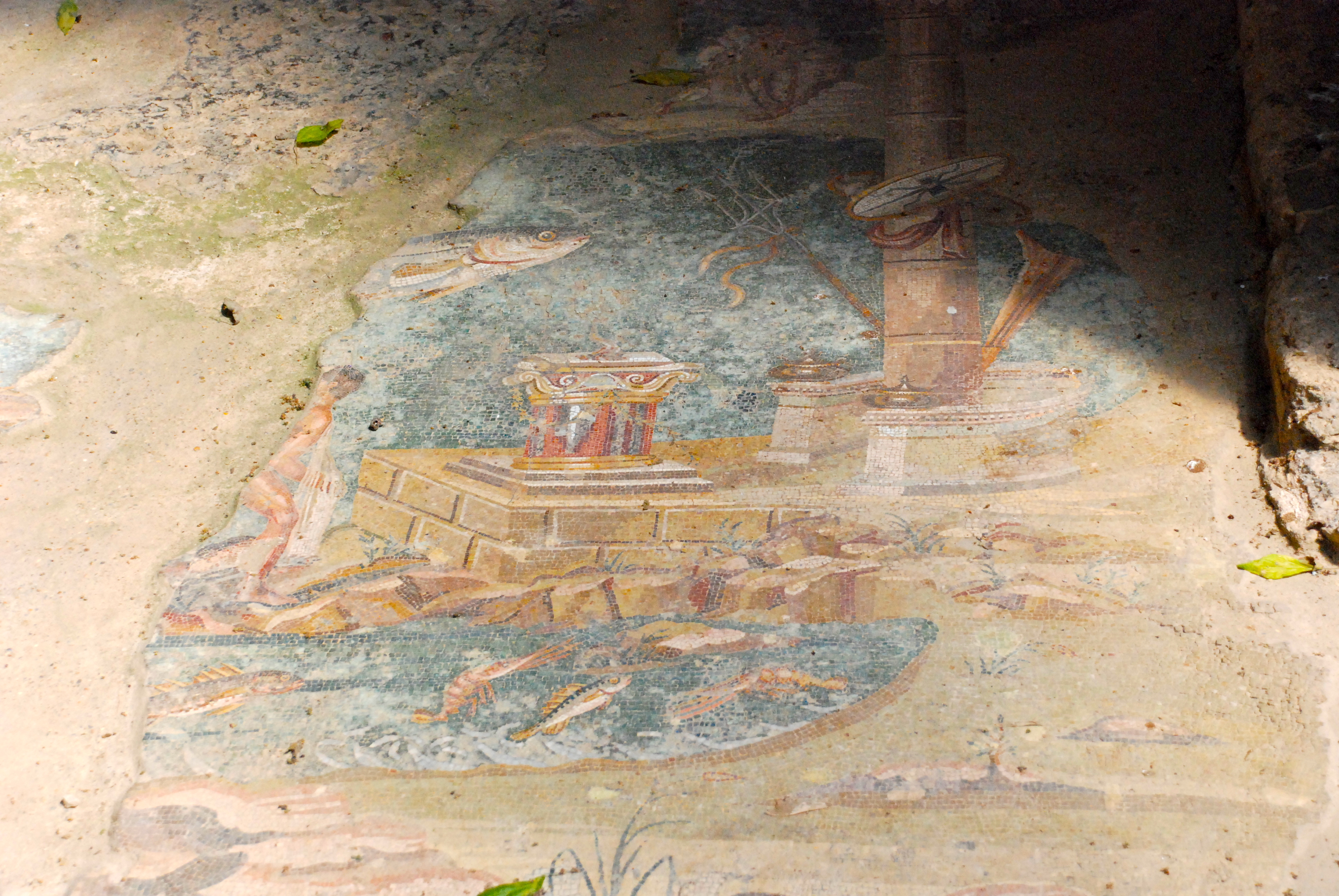
Mosaic of Fish

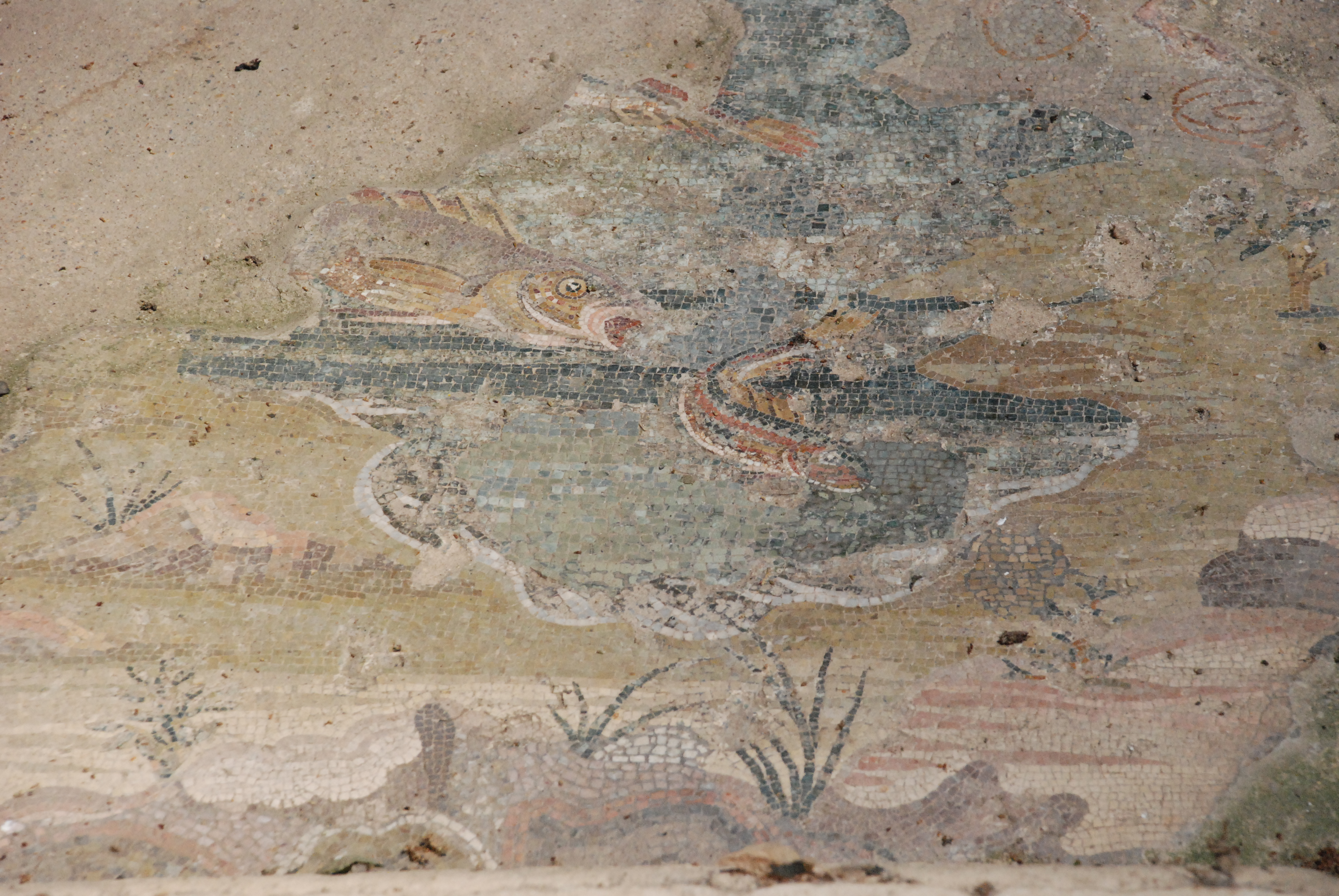
Mosaic of Fish

=== Lower terraces ===
The Via degli Arcioni complex on Via del Sole is part of a monumental set of terraces from the end of the 2nd century BC. The ancient street is supported by a series of vaulted rooms (known as the "Arcioni") which supported the upper terrace. It is part of a composite monumental façade that stands on a massive opus quadratum wall which formed the southern defence of the upper town during the late Republican Era (2nd-1st century BC). The arches have been used until recently as shops, stables and workshops resulting in the partial destruction of the rear walls. The terraces were restored in 2017.

Water from the mountain was channelled into a conduit under the paving of Via del Sole from where it flowed behind each of the rooms before being conveyed to an underground cistern.

In the middle of the massive wall was the monumental entrance to the city; a staircase, flanked on either side by two enormous symmetrical monumental nymphaea of which only the western one (the so-called "Propylaeum") remains, leading to the forum. This monument lies on a big tuff moulded base and is a complex structure of basins and niches for fountains and water features, with a complex system of internal conduits and passages.

At the end of via degli Arcioni is an enormous cistern from the Imperial Age built of red clay-bricks. The niches on the front-side were once decorated with statues.

=== City walls ===
The town also contains remnants of ancient cyclopean walls. On the summit of the hill at 753 metres (2,470 ft), nearly 1.6 kilometres (1 mi) from the town, stood the ancient citadel which had a surrounding wall and considerable portions of its southern part, built in massive cyclopean masonry consisting of limestone blocks, are still visible. Two walls, also polygonal, which formerly united the citadel with the town, can still be traced as can the lowest wall near the base of the sanctuary on Via del Borgo. The city was extended about a century later and a new wall, still in cyclopean style, extended the defenses on the easterns side as far as the present Porta del Sole.

=== Water Supply ===
Praeneste was supplied by numerous springs scattered throughout the area and by four aqueducts, which drew water from the springs of the Monti Prenestini: in addition to those of Fossatello, Formale, and Ga, the most important and oldest was Cannuccete.

The city developed a refined hydraulic system for water supply for everyday purposes and also to dramatically embellish public, civil, and sacred buildings. In the grandiose sanctuary of Fortuna, the monumental terraced architecture was further enriched by fountains, nymphaea, and water features along the entire ritual route. A series of fountains also adorned the area located at the entrance to the sanctuary, along today's Via del Borgo.

The monumental nymphaeum (called the "Propylaeum"), located at the entrance to the urban area within the walls, represents an extraordinary example of the practical application of Hellenistic hydraulic science achievements. Numerous cisterns and other storage and distribution structures are scattered throughout the area, starting with the most important complexes, such as the recently rediscovered cistern along Corso Pierluigi, the large one beneath Barberini Park, serving both storage and ornamental purposes, the enormous brick reservoir in Santa Lucia, which could hold up to 10 million litres, and the large reservoirs of "Pescara" and "Pescarozza" on Colle Martino.

The city also developed advanced systems for water disposal, using drains that ran underground under buildings, cavities in the vaults in Via degli Arcioni, and sewers.

In the central-western sector of the lower city, water arrived abundantly from the Bulliga springs and was stored in numerous cisterns concentrated in the area between Porta S. Martino and the Church of S. Lucia and along the western side of the lower city. In the central-eastern sector, the cisterns on the plateau are very numerous, distributed across various levels for supplying the many domus built there, while in the south-eastern sector cisterns are predominantly small, serving essentially agricultural purposes in this marginal part of the lower city.

=== Other sights ===
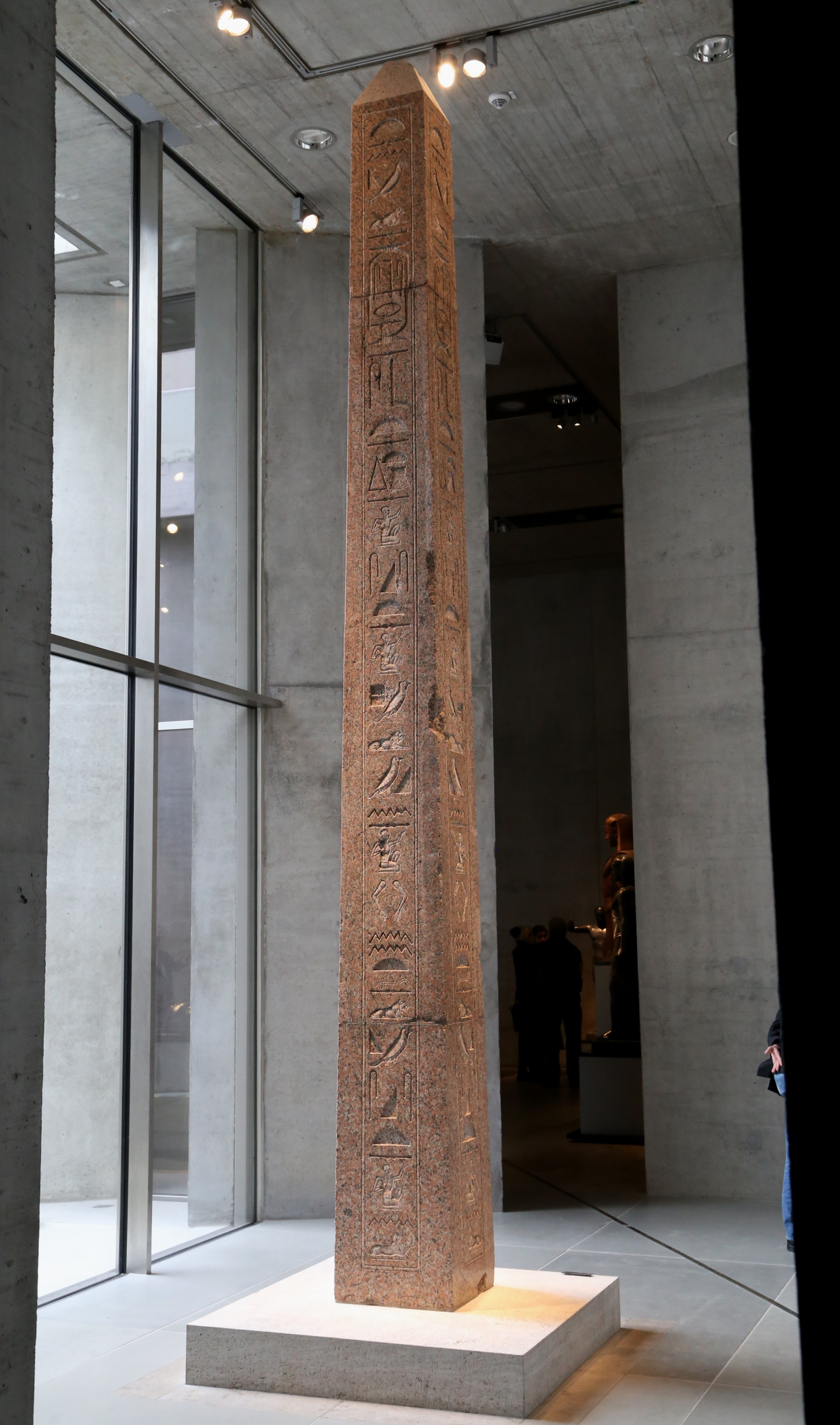
One of the Titus Sextius Africanus obelisks, at the Staatliches Museum Ägyptischer Kunst in Munich

In the forum area the Titus Sextius Africanus obelisks were erected in the reign of Claudius, which can be seen in the National Archaeological Museum of Palestrina, the Staatliches Museum Ägyptischer Kunst in Munich and the Naples Archaeological Museum.

A calendar, which according to Suetonius was set up by the grammarian Marcus Verrius Flaccus in the imperial forum of Praeneste (at the Madonna dell'Aquila), was discovered in 1771 in the ruins of the church of Saint Agapitus, where it had been used as building material.

The National Archeological Museum of Palestrina is housed inside the Renaissance Barberini Palace, the former baronial palace, built above the ancient temple theatre of Fortuna. It exhibits the most important works from the ancient town of Praeneste. The famous sculpture of the Capitoline Triad is exhibited on the first floor. The second floor is dedicated to the necropoli and sanctuaries, while the third floor contains a large polychrome mosaic depicting the flooding of the Nile (Nile mosaic of Palestrina).

== Famous residents ==
Palestrina was the home town of the 3rd-century Roman writer Aelian, and of the 16th-century composer Giovanni Pierluigi da Palestrina.

Thomas Mann spent some time there in 1895 and, two years later, during the long harsh summer of 1897, he stayed over again, with his brother Heinrich Mann, in a sojourn that provided the backdrop, nearly half a century later, for Adrian Leverkühn's pact with the Devil in Mann's novel Doktor Faustus.

== In popular culture ==
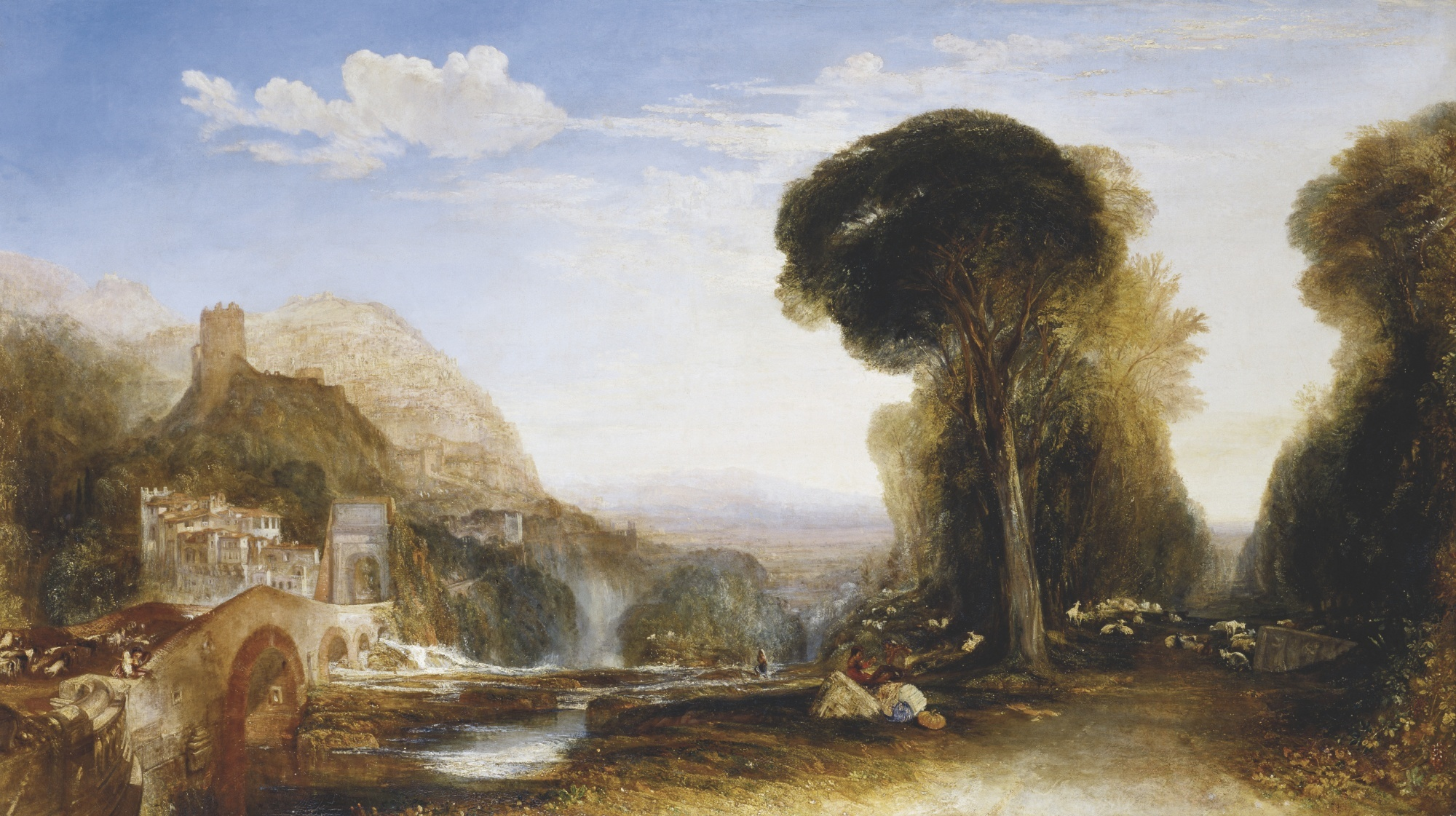
Palestrina - Composition by J.M.W. Turner, 1828

In Inferno, Dante makes reference to advice given by Guido da Montefeltro to Pope Boniface VIII to entice the surrender of Palestrina in 1298 by offering the Colonna family an amnesty. The amnesty was never intended to be honored, and instead Palestrina was razed to the ground.

In Voltaire's novel Candide a woman claims to be the daughter of Pope Urban X and the Princess of Palestrina.

A fictional account of Garibaldi's 1849 victory at Palestrina appears in Geoffrey Trease's novel Follow My Black Plume.

== Twin towns ==
- Füssen, Germany
- Bièvres, France, since 2007

== See also ==
- Roman Catholic Suburbicarian Diocese of Palestrina
- Praeneste fibula
