= Titus Sextius Africanus obelisks =

The Titus Sextius Africanus obelisks, also known as the Borgia and Albani obelisks, are a pair of Roman obelisks in Egyptian style. Both are dedicated to Titus Sextius Africanus.

One is in the Staatliches Museum Ägyptischer Kunst in Munich, having been originally erected in Rome. The other is in fragments split between the Naples Archaeological Museum and the Museo archeologico nazionale di Palestrina, having been originally erected in Palestrina.

== Gallery ==
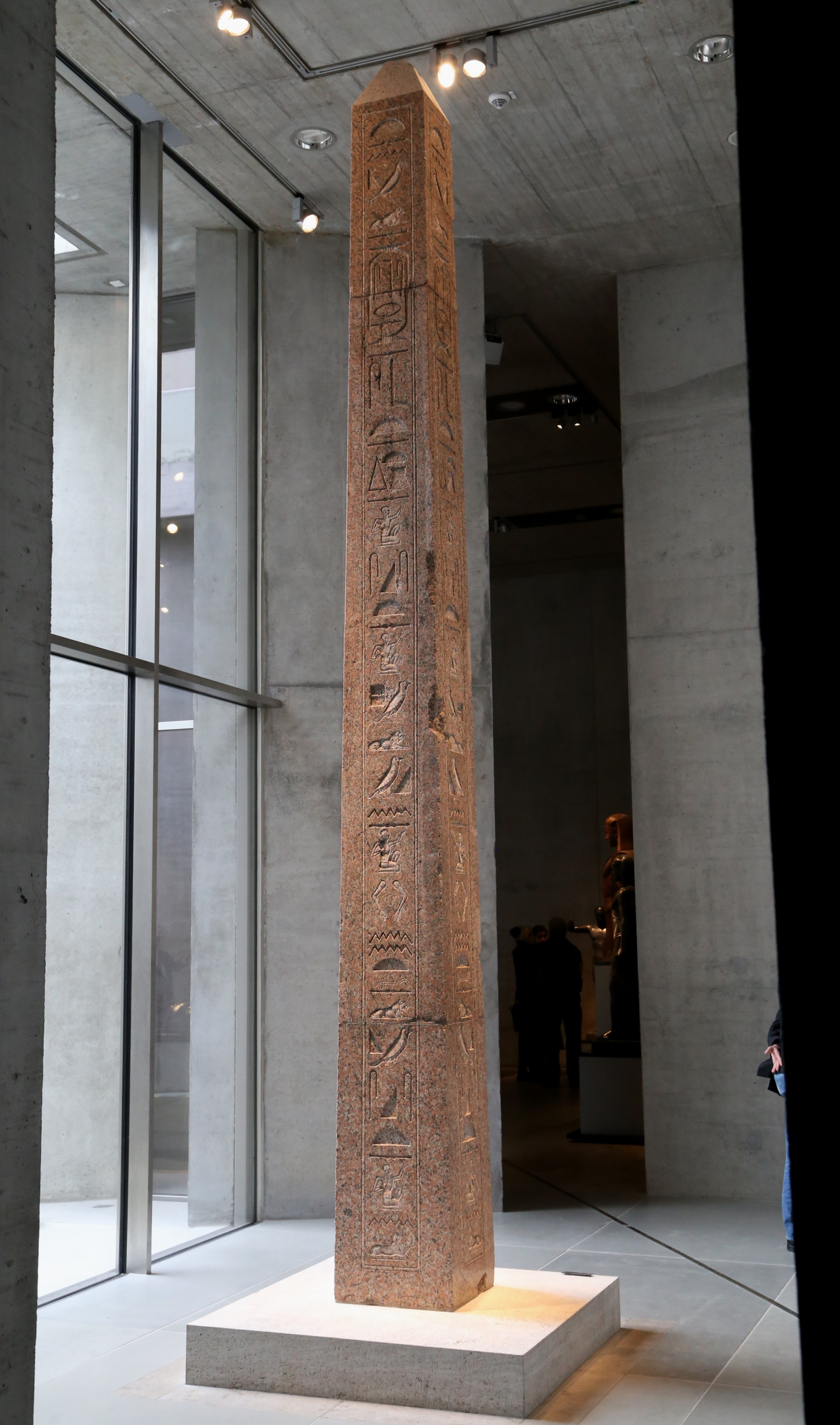
Munich

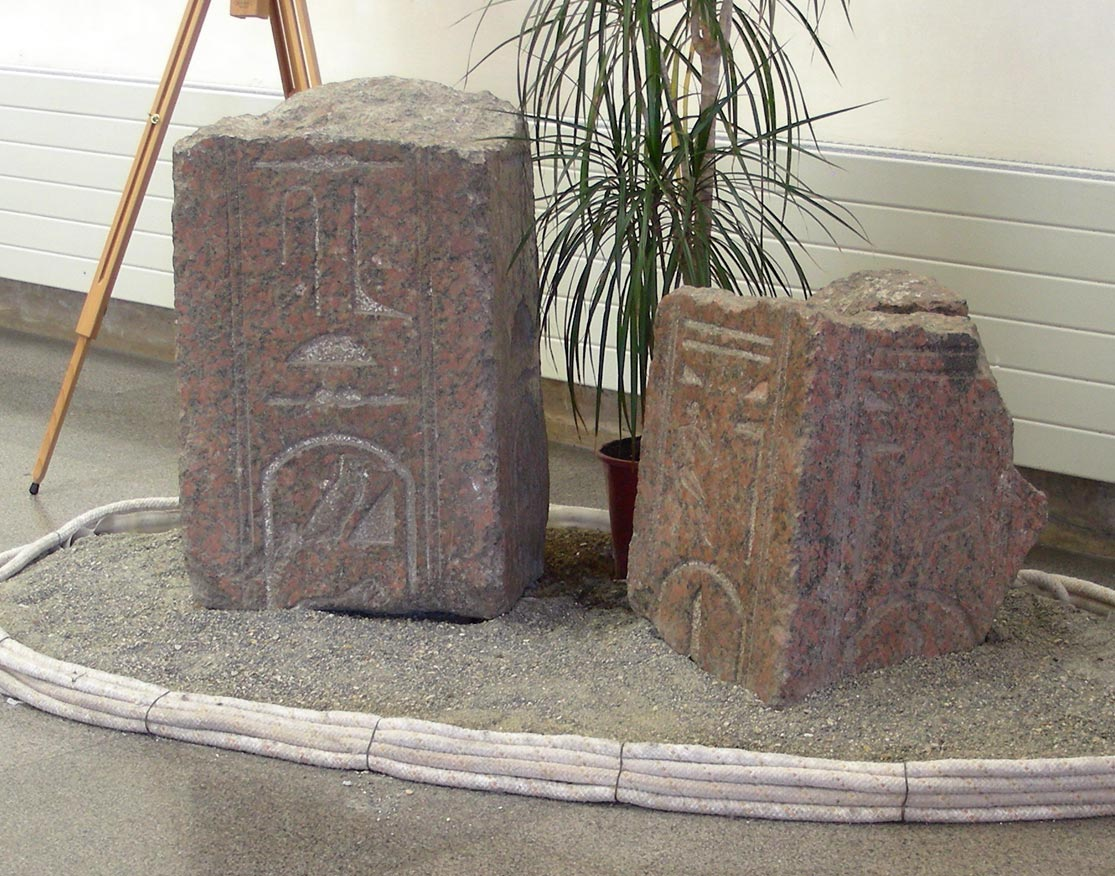
Palestrina

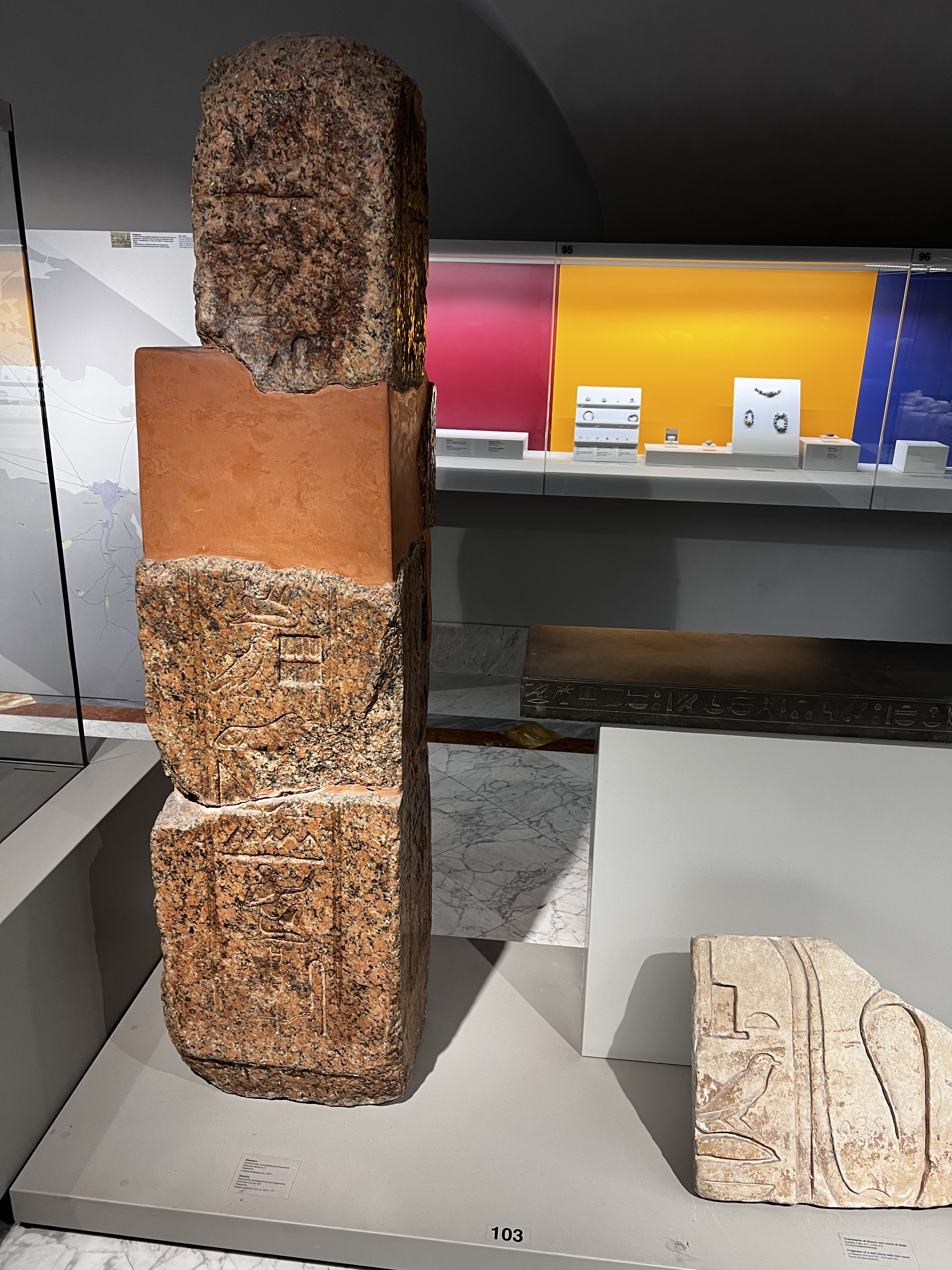
Naples
