= Obellia gens =

Ancient Roman family

The gens Obellia was an obscure plebeian family at ancient Rome, known almost entirely from inscriptions.

== Origin ==
The only clue to the origins of the Obellii is an inscription from Samnium, naming Saluta Obellia, daughter of Ovius. Both Saluta and Ovius are Oscan names, and several other Obellii are mentioned in inscriptions from Samnium, suggesting that the Obellii were Samnites, or at least of Oscan origin. The nomen Obellius might be derived from a cognomen Ovillus, from an adjective that means "pertaining to sheep", suggesting that an ancestor of the family was a shepherd. Another possibility is that Obellius could be a variation on the Oscan name Ofilius or Ofellius.

== Praenomina ==
The principal names of the Obelii were Manius and Gaius. Gaius was among the most common of all praenomina, while Manius was considerably more distinctive, although not actually rare. A number of Obellii used other common praenomina, including Lucius, Marcus, Publius, Quintus, Sextus, and Titus. There was at least one Spurius Obellius, mentioned in an inscription from Philippi, and from an Oscan inscription, we know of an Ovius Obellius, and his daughter, Saluta.

== Members ==
This list includes abbreviated praenomina. For an explanation of this practice, see filiation.

- Gaius Obellius C. f., one of the quattuorviri for carrying out the decrees of the senate at Aeclanum in Samnium.
- Gaius Obellius M. f., the husband of Mevia Obellia, buried at Saepinum in Samnium.
- Manius Obellius M'. f., named in an inscription from Praeneste in Latium.
- Manius Obellius, the former master of Manius Obellius Faustus, Manius Obellius Eros, and Obellia Theophila.
- Marcus Obellius, named in an inscription from Pompeii.
- Marcus Obellius, named in a list of municipal officials at Ostia.
- Mevia Obellia L. f., the wife of Gaius Obellius, buried at Saepinum.
- Saluta Obellia Ovi f., named in an inscription from Corfinium in Samnium.
- Sextus Obellius Sex. f., named in an inscription from Sassina in Umbria.
- Manius Obellius Acastus, an aurifex employed by the emperor Aurelian.
- Obellius L. f. Alexander, son of Lucius Obellius Crescens, helped erect a monument for his father.
- Obellia C. f. Cantabra, daughter of Gaius Obellius Stephanus, buried at Rome, aged seven.
- Obellia Celerina, the daughter of Junia Donata, buried at Ostia.
- Manius Obellius M'. l. Chaeria Hermogenes, a freedman, named in an inscription from Rome.
- Obellia Cleopatra, erected a monument to her daughter, Obellia Januaria.
- Manius Obellius M'. l. Compa, a freedman buried at Rome, with his wife, Salvedia.
- Lucius Obellius Crescens, the husband of Julia Eutychia and father of Obellius Alexander and Herculanus, buried at Scupi in Moesia Superior, aged seventy.
- Manius Obellius M'. l. Eros, freedman of Manius Obellius, named in a funerary inscription from Rome.
- Quintus Obellius Evangelus, named in a libationary inscription dedicated to Fortuna at Lugdunum.
- Manius Obellius Evaristus, named in an inscription from Ostia.
- Manius Obellius M'. l. Faustus, freedman of Manius Obellius and his wife, named in a funerary inscription from Rome.
- Obellia Felix, the wife of Lucus Castricius Hamillus, and mother of Lucius Castricius Felix, buried at Ostia.
- Obellius Firmus, erected a monument to his sister, Accia Moderata, at Venusia in Apulia.
- Obellia Fortunata, buried at Rome, was the wife of Gaius Julius Magnion.
- Manius Obellius M'. l. Fortunatus, a freedman buried at Rome. He was the client of Manius Obellius Hilarus.
- (Obellius) L. f. Herculanus, son of Lucius Obellius Crescens, helped erect a monument for his father.
- Manius Obellius M'. l. Hilarus, a freedman buried at Rome. He was the patron of Manius Obellius Fortunatus.
- Obellia L. l. Irena, a freedwoman, named in an inscription from Rome.
- Obellia Januaria, daughter of Obellia Cleopatra, was buried at Rome, aged twenty-one.
- Obellia Maxima, named in an inscription from Pola in the province of Venetia et Histria.
- Gaius Obellius Philocomus, freedman of the wife of (Gaius) Obellius, mentioned in an inscription from Nursia in Samnium.
- Obellia Prima, wife of a soldier buried at Scupi.
- Obellia S. f. Quarta, buried at Philippi with her husband, Marcus Vesonius Stephanus.
- Gaius Obellius Rufus, one of the curators of the banks of the Tiber during the reign of Claudius.
- Obellia Secularis, buried at Rome, aged seventy-five.
- Publius Obellius P. l. Sodala, a freedman named in an inscription from Corfinium.
- Gaius Obellius Stephanus, the father of Obellia Cantabra, mentioned in a funerary inscription from Rome.
- Manius Obellius Syneros, buried at Rome.
- Obellia P. l. Teudata, a freedwoman, mentioned in an inscription from Corfinium.
- Obellia M'. l. Theophila, freedwoman of Manius Obellius, named in a funerary inscription from Rome.
- Obellia Threpte, helped set up a monument for Lucius Lepidus Hermes, buried at Rome.
- Obellius Trophimus, the best friend of Aulus Egrilius Thallus, mentioned in an inscription from Ostia.
- Titus Obellius Vitalis, the husband of Ulpia Fortunata, and the father of Titus Obellius Valentis.
- Titus Obellius T. f. Vitalis, buried at Rome, aged one year, three months, and six days.

== See also ==
- List of Roman gentes

== Bibliography ==
- Theodor Mommsen et alii, Corpus Inscriptionum Latinarum (The Body of Latin Inscriptions, abbreviated CIL), Berlin-Brandenburgische Akademie der Wissenschaften (1853–present).
- Notizie degli Scavi di Antichità (News of Excavations from Antiquity, abbreviated NSA), Accademia dei Lincei (1876–present).
- René Cagnat et alii, L'Année épigraphique (The Year in Epigraphy, abbreviated AE), Presses Universitaires de France (1888–present).
- George Davis Chase, "The Origin of Roman Praenomina", in Harvard Studies in Classical Philology, vol. VIII (1897).
- Paul von Rohden, Elimar Klebs, & Hermann Dessau, Prosopographia Imperii Romani (The Prosopography of the Roman Empire, abbreviated PIR), Berlin (1898).
- Bengt E. Thomasson, “Iscrizioni del Sepolcreto di via Ostiense” (Inscriptions from Selpulchres of the Via Ostiensis, abbreviated ISOstiense), in Opuscula Romana, vol. I (1954), pp. 125–145.
- Fanou Papazoglou, Inscriptions de la Mésie Supérieure (Inscriptions of Moesia Superior, abbreviated IMS), Belgrade (1976–present).
- P. Pilhofer, Philippi, Band 2: "Katalog der Inschriften von Philippi" (Catalogue of Inscriptions from Philippi), Tübingen (2nd edition, 2009).
