= Selicia gens =

Ancient Roman family

The gens Selicia, possibly identical with Silicia, was an obscure plebeian family at ancient Rome. Hardly any members of this gens are mentioned in history, but a number are known from inscriptions.

== Origin ==
From a large number of inscriptions found there, it seems probable that the Selicii originated at the ancient Latin town of Praeneste, about 22 miles (35 kilometres) east of Rome. The nomen Selicius belongs to a class of gentilicia formed primarily from words or names ending in -ex. The root of this nomen appears to be selectus, chosen, for which Selex may have been a cognominal variant.

== Praenomina ==
The main praenomina of the Selicii were Gaius and Quintus, two of the most common names throughout all periods of Roman history. The Selicii also used a variety of other common praenomina, including Lucius, Publius, and Marcus, and occasionally other names, such as Aulus and Numerius.

== Members ==
This list includes abbreviated praenomina. For an explanation of this practice, see filiation.

- Selicia P. f., named in an inscription from Praeneste in Latium.
- Selicius, named in an inscription from Iufi in Africa Proconsularis.
- Gaius Selicius C. f., named in a funerary inscription from Rome, together with his freedwomen, Selicia Flora and Selicia Amoena, and a freedman, Gaius Selicius Hurtica.
- Lucius Selicius, buried at Pola in Venetia and Histria.
- Lucius Selicius, priest of Saturn at Mons Balcaranensis in Africa Proconsularis.
- Lucius Selicius N. f., named in an inscription from Praeneste.
- Marcus Selicius C. f., named in an inscription from Praeneste.
- Publius Selicius, named in an inscription from Praeneste.
- Publius Selicius, made an offering to Mercury at Thugga in Africa Proconsularis.
- Quintus Selicius, a friend and ally of Cicero and Publius Cornelius Lentulus Spinther, whom Cicero regarded as particularly shrewd and loyal. In 61 BC, Cicero names him as a possible source of money, at a time when he was expecting repayment from Gaius Antonius, who kept making excuses. Cicero considered buying a villa from Selicius in 46, but subsequently informed Lucius Papirius Paetus, who was acting as his agent at Neapolis, that he had decided against the purchase.
- Quintus Selicius, a freedman named in a mid-first century inscription from Aquileia in Venetia and Histria, together with Selicia Optata, and another freedman named Quintus Selicius Liccaeus.
- Quintus Selicius Q. f. Albinus, one of the municipal duumvirs at Pola, had been a military tribune, cavalry prefect, and aedile.
- Selicia C. l. Amoena, a freedwoman named in a funerary inscription from Rome, together with her former master, Gaius Selicius, another freedwoman, Selicia Flora, and the freedman Gaius Selicius Hurtica.
- Quintus Selicius Q. l. Antais, a freedman buried at Rome, together with Stratonice, a freedwoman.
- Selicius C. f. Apollinaris, buried at Mactaris in Africa Proconsularis, aged thirty-two, with a monument from his client, Lucius Silicius Restutus.
- Gaius Selicius L. f. Arabus, buried at Thugga, aged thirty.
- Lucius Selicius Artemas, one of the clients of Selicia Donata, to whom he built a monument at Ostia in Latium.
- Marcus Selicius Bassus, buried at Mactaris, aged seventy.
- Quintus Selicius Calippus, named in an inscription from Rome.
- Gaius Selicius C. f. C. n. Calvus, named in an inscription from Praeneste.
- Selicia Donata, buried at Ostia, with a monument from her clients, Lucius Selicius Restitutus, Lucius Selicius Artemas, Selicia Sabina, and Selicia Tusca.
- Selicia Euphrosyne, dedicated a monument at Rome to her friend, Gaius Julius Atticus.
- Selicia F[...] Ingenua, buried at Mactaris, aged seventy-six years, two months.
- Selicius Felix, buried at Sutunura in Africa Proconsularis, with a monument from his son, Selicius Saturninus, dating to the early third century.
- Gaius Selicius C. et P. Rutili l. Felix, the freedman of Gaius Selicius and Publius Rutilius, named in an inscription from Rome, together with the freedman Gaius Selicius Glyco, and the freedwoman Selicia Melete.
- Selicia C. l. Flora, a freedwoman named in a funerary inscription from Rome, together with her former master, Gaius Selicius, another freedwoman, Selicia Amoena, and the freedman Gaius Selicius Hurtica.
- Selicius Geminus, one of the Seviri Augustales at Pola, dedicated a monument to Laecania Amoena.
- Lucius Selicius Geminus, the master of Nothus, a slave employed as a money-changer at Pola, where Nothus was buried, aged twenty-three.
- Aulus Selicius A. l. Gentius, a freedman named in an inscription from Praeneste.
- Gaius Selicius C. l. Glyco, a freedman named in an inscription from Rome, together with the freedwoman Selicia Melete, and the freedman Gaius Selicius Felix. Perhaps the same Gaius Selicius Glyco (Note: His surname given as "Glucon" in the inscription.) buried at Rome.
- Gaius Selicius C. l. Hurtica, a freedman named in a funerary inscription from Rome, together with his former master, Gaius Selicius, and the freedwomen Selicia Flora and Selicia Amoena.
- Quintus Selicius Q. l. Liccaeus, a freedman named in a mid-first century inscription from Aquileia, together with Selicia Optata, and another freedman named Quintus Selicius.
- Selicia C. l. Melete, a freedwoman named in an inscription from Rome, together with the freedmen Gaius Selicius Glyco and Gaius Selicius Felix.
- Selicia Q. l. Menodice, a freedwoman buried at Rome in the late first century BC.
- Selicia Q. l. Optata, a freedwoman named in a mid-first century inscription from Aquileia, together with freedmen named Quintus Selicius and Quintus Selicius Liccaeus.
- Selicia C. f. Postuma, named in an inscription from Pola, together with Gaius Octavius Attus.
- Lucius Selicius Restitutus, one of the clients of Selicia Donata, to whom he built a monument at Ostia.
- Lucius Selicius Restutus, built a monument at Mactaris to his patron, Selicius Apollinaris.
- Gaius Selicius Rogatus, buried at Mactaris, aged thirteen.
- Selicia Sabina, one of the clients of Selicia Donata, to whom she built a monument at Ostia.
- Selicia P. f. Saturnina, buried at Mactaris, aged between fifty and sixty.
- Selicius Saturninus, one of the municipal officials at Sutunura, dedicated a monument to his father, Selicius Felix, dating to the early third century.
- Selicia Tusca, one of the clients of Selicia Donata, to whom she built a monument at Ostia.
- Gaius Selicius Victor, buried at Carthage in Africa Proconsularis.

== See also ==
- List of Roman gentes

== Bibliography ==
- Marcus Tullius Cicero, Epistulae ad Atticum, Epistulae ad Familiares.
- Dictionary of Greek and Roman Biography and Mythology, William Smith, ed., Little, Brown and Company, Boston (1849).
- Theodor Mommsen et alii, Corpus Inscriptionum Latinarum (The Body of Latin Inscriptions, abbreviated CIL), Berlin-Brandenburgische Akademie der Wissenschaften (1853–present).
- Bulletin Archéologique du Comité des Travaux Historiques et Scientifiques (Archaeological Bulletin of the Committee on Historic and Scientific Works, abbreviated BCTH), Imprimerie Nationale, Paris (1885–1973).
- René Cagnat et alii, L'Année épigraphique (The Year in Epigraphy, abbreviated AE), Presses Universitaires de France (1888–present).
- George Davis Chase, "The Origin of Roman Praenomina", in Harvard Studies in Classical Philology, vol. VIII, pp. 103–184 (1897).
- Inscriptiones Italiae (Inscriptions from Italy), Rome (1931-present).
- John C. Traupman, The New College Latin & English Dictionary, Bantam Books, New York (1995).
- Mustapha Khanoussi and Louis Maurin, Mourir à Dougga. Receuil des inscriptions funéraires (Death at Dougga: a Collection of Funerary Inscriptions, abbreviated MAD), Bordeaux, Tunis (2002).
- Carte Nationale des Sites Archéologiques et des Monuments Historiques (National Register of Archeological Sites and Historical Monuments of Tunisia, abbreviated CNSATunisie).
