= Silicia gens =

Ancient Roman family

The gens Silicia, possibly the same as Selicia, was an obscure plebeian family at ancient Rome. Hardly any members of this gens are mentioned in history, but a number are known from inscriptions, many of them from Roman Africa.

== Origin ==
The nomen Silicius belongs to a class of gentilicia derived from words ending in -ex. The apparent root, silex, refers to flint.

== Praenomina ==
The Silicii used a variety of praenomina, including Lucius, Gaius, Marcus, Publius, Quintus, Titus, and Aulus, all of which were amongst the most common names throughout all periods of Roman history. At least one of the family bore the praenomen Spurius, an old name that had all but vanished by imperial times.

== Members ==
This list includes abbreviated praenomina. For an explanation of this practice, see filiation.

- Publius Silicius Coronas, (Note: Icilius in Appian.) one of the judges who voted to acquit Brutus for his part in the murder of Caesar. He was proscribed and put to death by the triumvirs.
- Quintus Silicius Pausia, named in an inscription from Rome, dating to the first half of the first century.
- Silicius Rufus, named in a dedicatory inscription from Tergeste in Venetia and Histria, dating to the late first or early second century.
- Silicia Viola, buried at Julia Concordia in Venetia and Histria, in a tomb dating to the late first or early second century, together with Lucius Calventius Atticus.
- Lucius Silicius Nicon, dedicated a tomb at Rome, dating to the early second century, to his son, Lucius Silicius Nicon.
- Lucius Silicius L. f. Nicon, a young man buried at Rome, aged twenty-two years, six months, and twenty days, with a monument from his father, Lucius Silicius Nicon, dating to the early second century.
- Titus Silicius Fortunatus, a standard-bearer in the third legion at Lambaesis in AD 141.
- Lucius Silicius Fortunatus, a native of Puteoli in Campania, was a soldier in the Praetorian Guard, serving in the century of Firmus, in AD 143.
- Marcus Silicius Verus, a native of Urbinum in Umbria, was an officer in the Praetorian Guard, in AD 144.
- Lucius Silicius, named in a second-century funerary inscription from Rome.
- Silicius Longus, a soldier in the Praetorian Guard, was buried at his native Misenum, aged forty, having served for twenty-one years, with a tomb built by Claudius Longinus, dating to the latter part of the second century.
- Gaius Silicius Januarius, a soldier serving in the third legion at Lambaesis in Numidia, in AD 173.
- Silicius Urbanus, a soldier serving in the third legion in Africa Proconsularis during the reign of Septimius Severus, in the century of Valerius Proculus.
- Silicius Quartus, a soldier serving in the third legion in Africa Proconsularis during the reign of Septimius Severus, in the century of Domitius Maximus.
- Lucius Silicius Firmus Mandrogenes, a native of Magnesia on the Maeander, was the winner of the pankration at the 248th Olympiad, in AD 208. Philostratus mentions that he was descended from an aristocratic family on his mother's side.
- Quintus Silicius Victor, together with Gaius Tadius Fortunatus, dedicated a statue in honor of Julia Domna at Pagus Mercurialis in Africa Proconsularis, dating between AD 209 and 211.
- Titus Silicius Januarius, one of the officers in charge of the arsenal of the fifth cohort of the vigiles in AD 210.
- Titus Silicius Rutilianus, a prefect exempted from menial duties, serving in the fifth cohort of the vigiles in AD 210.
- Lucius Silicius Augustalis, one of the officers of the day for a century in the fifth cohort of the vigiles in AD 210.
- Gaius Silicius Crescentianus, a soldier in the fifth cohort of the vigiles in AD 210.
- Lucius Silicius Rufus, one of the municipal duumvirs at Lambaesis, named in an inscription dating between AD 379 and 383.

=== Undated Silicii ===
- Silicia, named in a funerary inscription from Ad Aquas Caesaris in Africa Proconsularis.
- Silicia L. f., the daughter of Lucius Silicius Praenestinus, buried at Madauros in Africa Proconsularis, aged forty.
- Marcus Silicius, the husband of Valeria and father of Marcus Silicius Catus.
- Lucius Silicius [...]ninus, buried at Lambaesis, aged forty, with a monument from his heir, Lucius Sextilius Felix.
- Silicia Agatha, the wife of Marcus Acutius Aegipas, a freedman named in an inscription from Puteoli.
- Gaius Silicius C. f. Argutus, named in an inscription from Thabraca in Africa Proconsularis.
- Gaius Silicius Campus, one of the magistrates at Castellum Medianum in Mauretania Caesariensis.
- Quintus Silicius Q. f. Castus, buried at Thibilis in Numidia, aged thirty-five.
- Marcus Silicius M. f. Catus, the son of Marcus Silicius and Valeria, was a soldier buried at Portus Magnus in Numidia, aged twenty-four, having served for two years.
- Lucius Silicius L. f. Celer, buried at Aquileia in Venetia and Histria, along with Publius Avillius.
- Silicius Donatus, one of the Sodales Augustales, was buried at Tarraco in Hispania Citerior, aged twenty-five years and nine days, with a monument from Marinius Catinianus.
- Silicia Euphrosyne, dedicated a monument at Rome to her daughter, Suatica, daughter of Heortenus.
- Gaius Silicius Exories, named in an inscription from Rome.
- Silicia Faustina, a little girl buried at Rome, aged four years, five months, and one day.
- Silicia Q. f. Felicula, the daughter of Quintus Silicius Hera, buried in a family sepulchre at Rome.
- Silicius Felix, the son of Silicius Secundus and Antilia Victorica, was buried at Thagura in Africa Proconsularis, aged twenty-five, in a tomb built by his mother.
- Silicius L. f. Felix, the son of Lucius Silicius and Rerricha, and grandson of Rusticius Romanus, dedicated a monument at Leptis Parva in Africa Proconsularis to his mother and brother, Lucius Silicius Saturninus.
- Quintus Silicius Felix, buried at Lamasba in Numidia, aged eighty-eight, along with his wife, Julia Rogatina.
- Quintus Silicius Q. f. Felix, the son of Quintus Silicius Hera, buried in a family sepulchre at Rome.
- Gaius Silicius Fellis, buried at Thibilis.
- Titus Silicius T. f. Firmus, the son of Titus Silicius Teleius and Ulpia Daphne, buried at Salona in Dalmatia, aged seven years, five months, and sixteen days.
- Silicia Fortunata, buried at Mustis in Africa Proconsularis, aged forty-seven.
- Lucius Silicius Fronto, buried at Rome, in a tomb built by his wife, Athenia Amanda.
- Titus Silicius Gorgia, a freedman named in an inscription from Buthrotum in Macedonia, together with Titus Silicius Suavis.
- Silicius Gudus, buried in Numidia, aged twenty-five.
- Quintus Silicius Hera, buried in a family sepulchre at Rome, together with his mother, Silicia Prima, and children, Quintus Silicius Felix and Silicia Felicula.
- Aulus Silicius Hilaris, probably a freedman, named in an inscription from Castellum Dimmidi in Numidia.
- Silicia Honorata, buried at Thibilis, aged fifty-five.
- Lucius Silicius Honoratus, buried at Thibaris in Africa Proconsularis, aged sixty-five.
- Silicia Hospitalis, buried at Rusicade in Numidia, aged twenty-one.
- Gaius Silicius Ivennonius, buried at Thibilis, aged seventy-five.
- Silicia Januaria, buried at Thuburnica in Africa Proconsularis, aged seventy.
- Silicius Januarius, buried at Madauros, aged seventy.
- Lucius Silicius Julianus, buried at Castellum Celtianum in Numidia, aged forty.
- Silicia C. f. Lucilla, buried at Thibilis, aged seventy-six.
- Marcus Silicius Marianus, buried at the present site of Oum Ladjoul, formerly part of Numidia, aged fifty.
- Quintus Silicius Martialus, built a tomb at Hippo Regius in Africa Proconsularis for his wife, Clavacina.
- Silicia Matutina, buried at Sigus in Numidia, aged fifty.
- Gaia Silicia Matutina, buried at Lambaesis, aged sixty-five.
- Silicius Messor, buried at Thibilis, aged three.
- Silicia Namgidde, a native of Africa, buried at Fanum Martis in Gallia Lugdunensis, aged sixty-five, with a monument from her son, Gaius Flavius Januarius.
- Silicia Nampame, buried at Thibilis, aged forty-six.
- Lucius Silicius Optatus, a veteran buried at Simitthus in Africa Proconsularis, aged fifty.
- Silicia C. f. Placida, dedicated a monument at Forum Julii in Gallia Narbonensis to her son, Gaius Valerius Placidus, a soldier in the fourteenth legion.
- Silicia Prima, the mother of Quintus Silicius Hera, buried in a family sepulchre at Rome.
- Silicius Primus, made an offering to Saturn in Africa Proconsularis.
- Gaius Silicius Primus, a little boy buried at Lambaesis, aged three.
- Silicia Recepta, buried at Ausafa in Africa Proconsularis, aged twenty-five.
- Gaius Silicius Romanus Thacorensis, made an offering to the gods at Rome, together Frucia Victoria.
- Silicia P. f. Rustica, buried at Calama in Numidia, aged sixty.
- Lucius Silicius L. f. Saturninus, the son of Lucius Silicius and Rerricha, and grandson of Rusticius Romanus, was a soldier in the third legion, serving in the century of Julius Ligur. He died in battle while serving under the centurion Lucilius, and was buried at Leptis Parva, aged forty, having served for nineteen years, with a monument from his brother, Silicius Felix.
- Quintus Silicius Saturninus, buried at Mustis, aged seventy-five.
- Silicius Secundus, the husband of Antilia Victorica, and father of Silicius Felix, was buried at Thagura, in a tomb built by his wife.
- Silicius Silicianus, a flamen at Lambaesis.
- Quintus Silicius Silvanus, (Note: Silbanus in the inscription.) a native of Africa, and a soldier in the Praetorian Guard, was buried at Misenum, aged sixty, with a monument dedicated by his wife, Messea Januaria, and son, Quintus Silicius Silvanus.
- Quintus Silicius Q. f. Silvanus, son of Quintus Silicius Silvanus and Messea Januaria.
- Silicus Solutor, buried at Thibilis, aged seventy-five.
- Titus Silicius Suavis, a freedman named in an inscription from Buthrotum, together with Titus Silicius Gorgia.
- Spurius Silicius Successus, buried at Curculum in Numidia, aged sixty.
- Titus Silicius Teleius, the husband of Ulpia Daphne, and father of Titus Silicius Firmus, a boy buried at Salona.
- Silicius Victor, a soldier buried at Misenum, aged twenty-eight years, having served for eight years, seven months, and five days.
- Gaius Silicius Victor, a priest mentioned in a devotional inscription from Numidia.
- Quintus Silicius L. f. Victorinus Cornelianus Honoratianus, was flamen, duumvir, and aedile at Bulla Regia in Africa Proconsularis.
- Silicia P. Ɔ. l. Zosime, a freedwoman named in an inscription from Rome.

== See also ==
- List of Roman gentes

== Bibliography ==
- Lucius Mestrius Plutarchus (Plutarch), Lives of the Noble Greeks and Romans.
- Appianus Alexandrinus (Appian), Bellum Civile (The Civil War).
- Lucius Cassius Dio Cocceianus (Cassius Dio), Roman History.
- Lucius Flavius Philostratus, Gymnasticus.
- Dictionary of Greek and Roman Biography and Mythology, William Smith, ed., Little, Brown and Company, Boston (1849).
- Theodor Mommsen et alii, Corpus Inscriptionum Latinarum (The Body of Latin Inscriptions, abbreviated CIL), Berlin-Brandenburgische Akademie der Wissenschaften (1853–present).
- Gustav Wilmanns, Inscriptiones Africae Latinae (Latin Inscriptions from Africa, abbreviated ILAfr), Georg Reimer, Berlin (1881).
- René Cagnat et alii, L'Année épigraphique (The Year in Epigraphy, abbreviated AE), Presses Universitaires de France (1888–present).
- Stéphane Gsell, Recherches Archéologiques en Algérie (Archaeological Investigations in Algeria, abbreviated RAA), Paris (1893); Inscriptions Latines de L'Algérie (Latin Inscriptions from Algeria, abbreviated ILAlg), Edouard Champion, Paris (1922–present).
- George Davis Chase, "The Origin of Roman Praenomina", in Harvard Studies in Classical Philology, vol. VIII, pp. 103–184 (1897).
- Anna and Jaroslav Šašel, Inscriptiones Latinae quae in Iugoslavia inter annos MCMXL et MCMLX repertae et editae sunt (Inscriptions from Yugoslavia Found and Published between 1940 and 1960, abbreviated ILJug), Ljubljana (1963–1986).
- Giovanni Battista Brusin, Inscriptiones Aquileiae (Inscriptions of Aquileia, abbreviated InscrAqu), Udine (1991–1993).
- John C. Traupman, The New College Latin & English Dictionary, Bantam Books, New York (1995).
- Skender Anamali, Hasan Ceka, and Élisabeth Deniaux, Corpus des Inscriptions Latines d'Albanie (The Body of Latin Inscriptions of Albania, abbreviated CIA), École Française de Rome, Rome (2009).
- James Lynch, The Ancient Olympiads: 776 BC to 393 AD, Warwick Press (2015).
