= Staatliches Museum Ägyptischer Kunst =

Museum of Egyptian art in Munich

Coordinates: 48°08′49″N 11°34′07″E

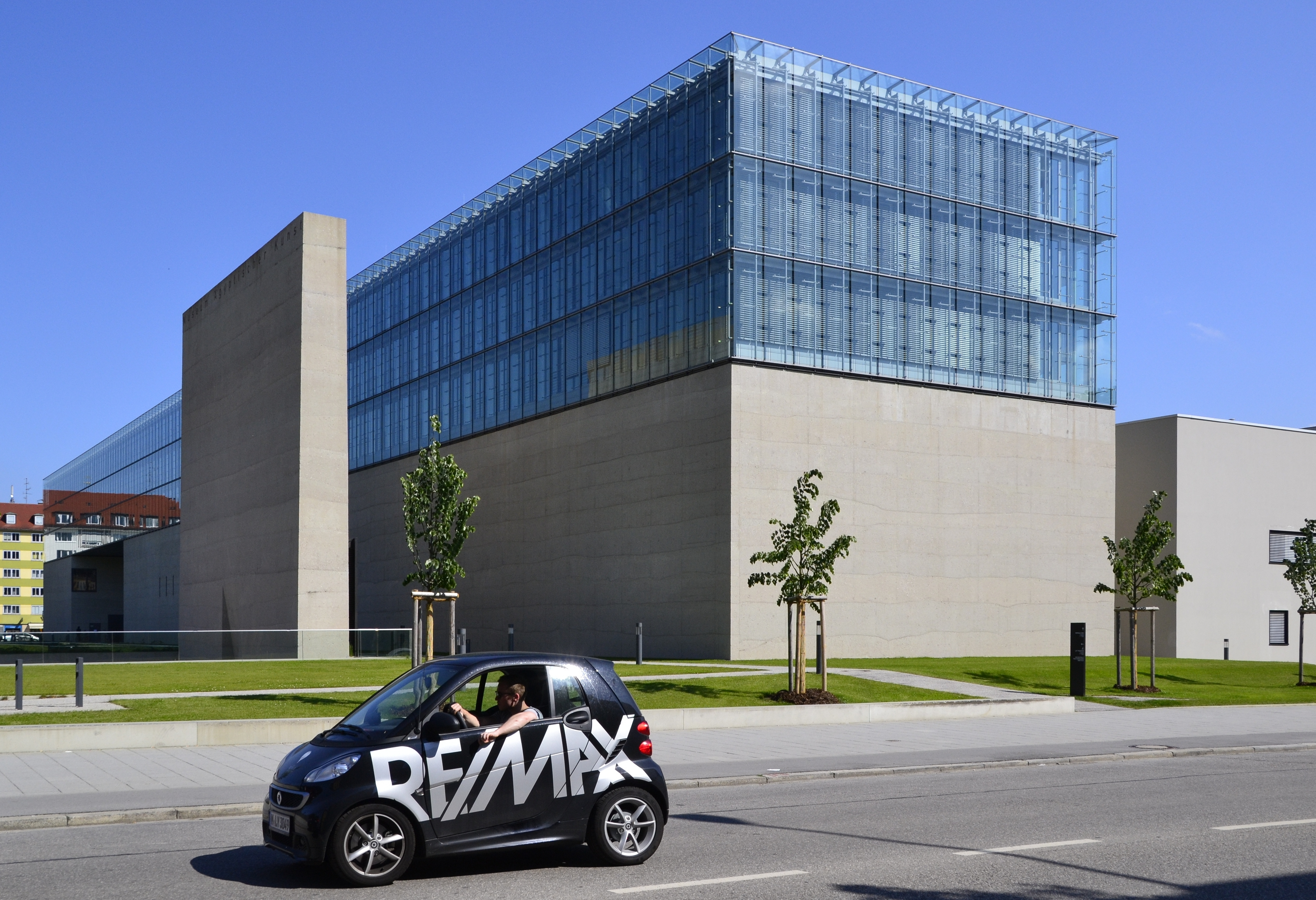
The Museum building

Staatliche Sammlung für Ägyptische Kunst, Munich

The Staatliches Museum Ägyptischer Kunst (German: [ˈʃtaːtlɪçəs muˈzeːʊm ʔɛˈɡʏptɪʃɐ ˈkʊnst], State Museum of Egyptian Art) is an archaeological museum in Munich. It contains the Bavarian state collection of ancient Egyptian art and displays exhibits from both the predynastic and dynastic periods. The associated small Middle East section displays objects from the areas of Assyrian and Babylonian culture. For decades, the Egyptian museum was located in the Munich Residenz, but it was moved to the Kunstareal in June 2013.

== Building ==
A new, subterranean museum, opposite the Alte Pinakothek and reaching underneath the new structure for the University of Television and Film Munich was conceived by the architect Peter Böhm. The project was inspired by an ancient Egyptian burial chamber. Its entrance area is marked with a portal wall reminiscent of the pylon gateways to Egyptian temples. It offers some 1800 m² of exhibition space, with an additional 400 m² for special exhibitions. It is open since June 2013. The light-filled entrance hall leads to three large halls, and subsequently into smaller, darker and lower catacombs with several theme rooms such as "The Pharaoh", "Religion", "Realm of the Dead", "Beyond belief," "Egypt in Rome" or "After the Pharaohs". An atrium brings natural light into some parts of the exhibition.

== History ==
The Bavarian state's collection was already founded in the 16th century by Duke Albrecht V and extended especially by Charles Theodore, Elector of Bavaria and King Ludwig I of Bavaria. Also private donators and the Academy of Sciences contributed to the collection. The museum is dedicated to the periods of the early, middle and late kingdoms, but also to the Hellenistic, Roman and Coptic era of Egypt.

== Collection ==
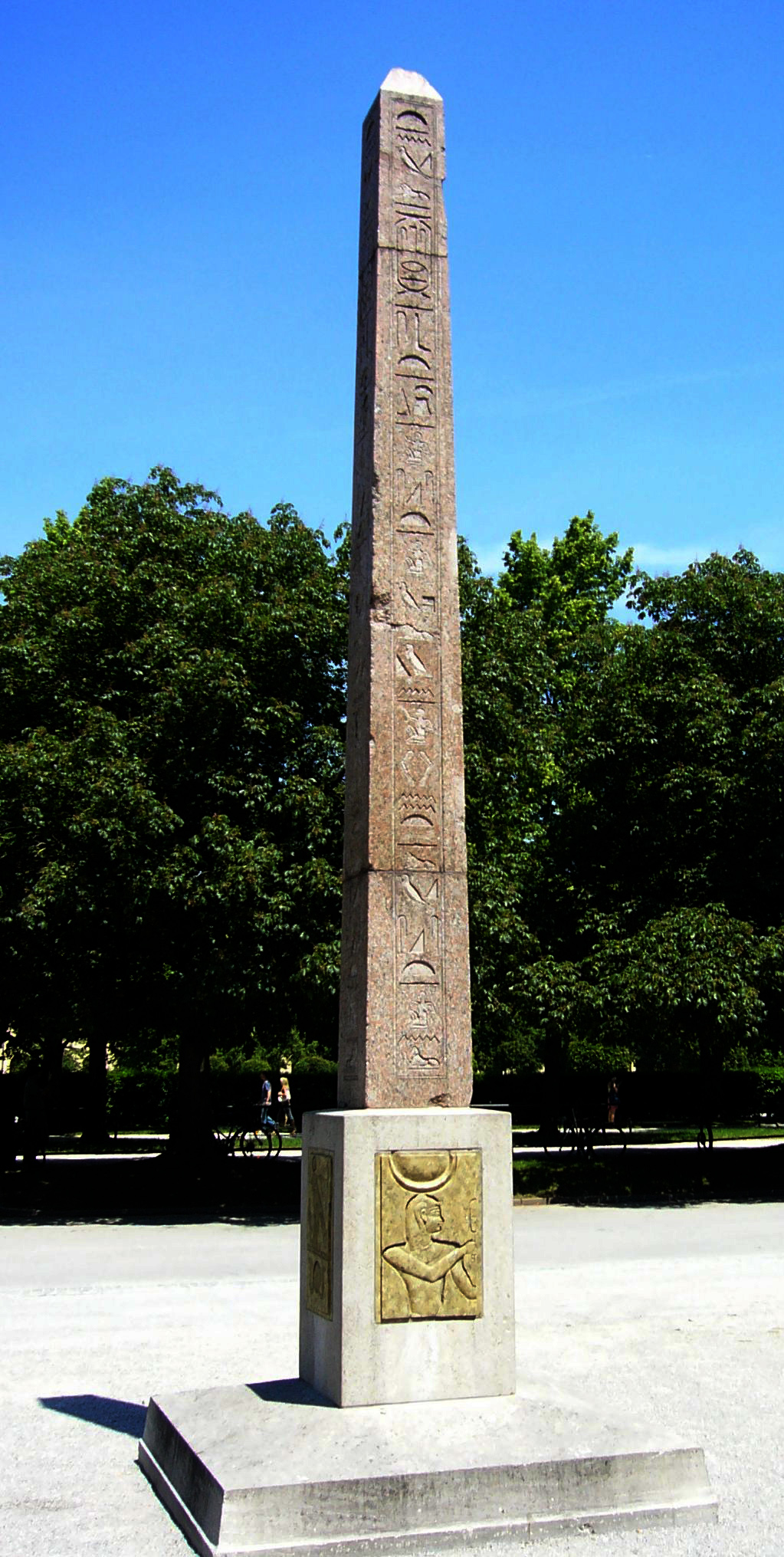
The Titus Sextius Africanus obelisk before the Residenz was moved into the museum.

The museum displays ancient Egyptian artefacts, such as statues, sculptures, cult articles, papyri, stone tablets with hieroglyphics, glasswares, jewellery, amulets but also mummies, textiles and household goods. About 2000 of more than 8000 objects are displayed permanently. There are also temporary exhibitions.

Among the most distinguished exhibits are the famous duplex statue portraying the pharaoh Nyuserre Ini as a youth and as an elder man, the false door of the grave chamber of Menes, the statues of the pharaohs Amenemhat III, Ramses II, Thutmose III and Akhenaten, the sphinx of Sesostris III and of Amenhotep II, the sarcophagus lid of queen Sitdjehuti and the kneeling figure of Senenmut. One of the most famous exhibits is the glass cup with the inscription of Thutmose III, the oldest glass vessel in the world (1450 BC).

The upper part of a priest statue dates from the Persian period (ca. 500 BC). The Hellenistic-Roman period is represented by master pieces such as the bust of a Seleucid ruler and the grand Egyptian statue of Antinous. The Titus Sextius Africanus obelisk in the atrium is 5.80 meters high, the central part dates from the 50 AD, the rest was added later and restored several times.

Very precious is the treasure of jewellery of the Nubian Queen Amanishakheto. The museum owns also the Assyrian Orthostates reliefs from the palace of king Ashur-nasir-pal II and a lion tile from the Ishtar Gate of Babylon which were once displayed in the Glyptothek.

Since 1912 the museum has held the mummy of a child aged between 4 and 6 years old found by Flinders Petrie near the Hawara Pyramid. The mummy includes a Fayum mummy portrait which CT scans suggest are a reasonably accurate representation of the child in question.

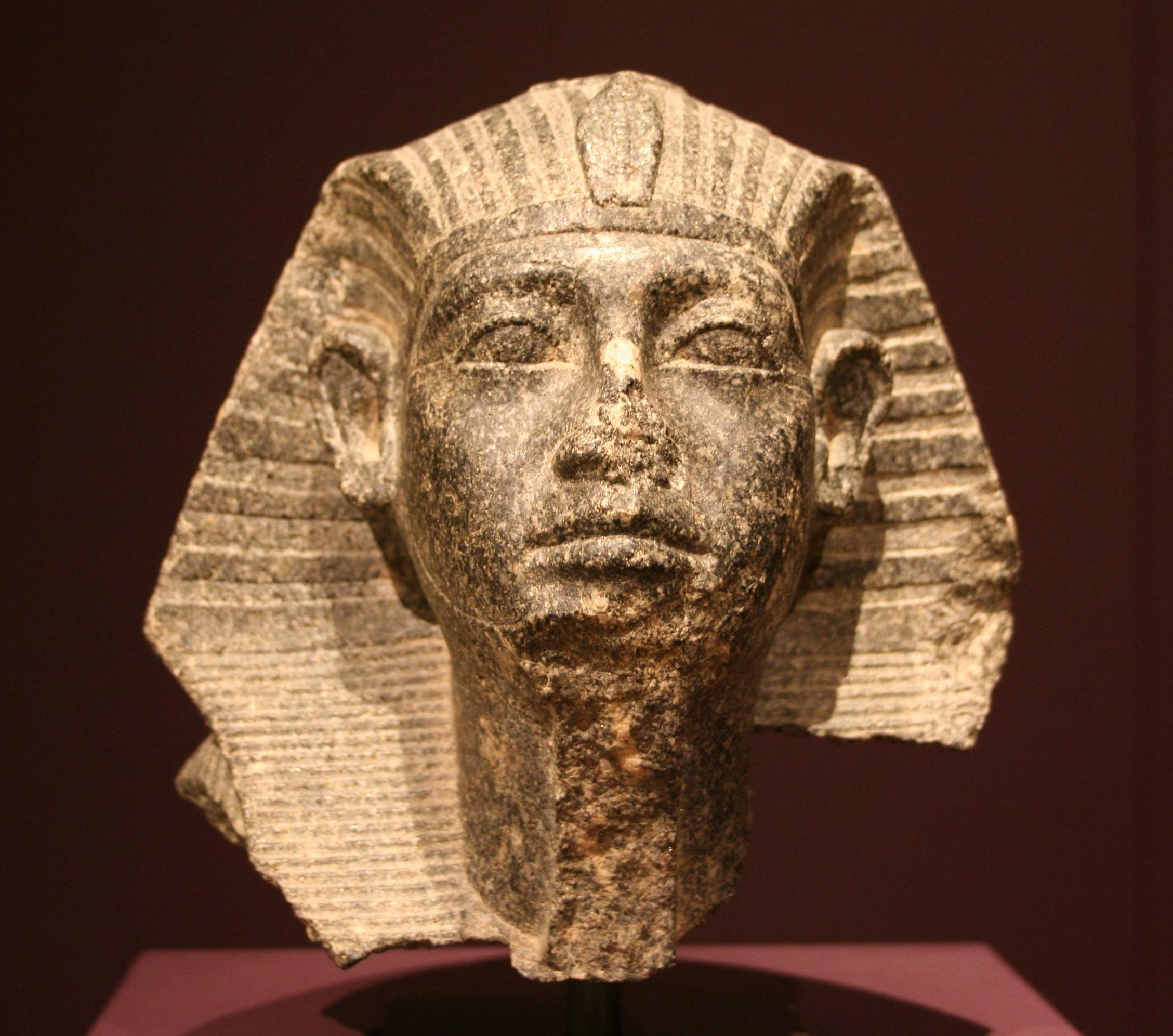
Sphinx of Sesostris III

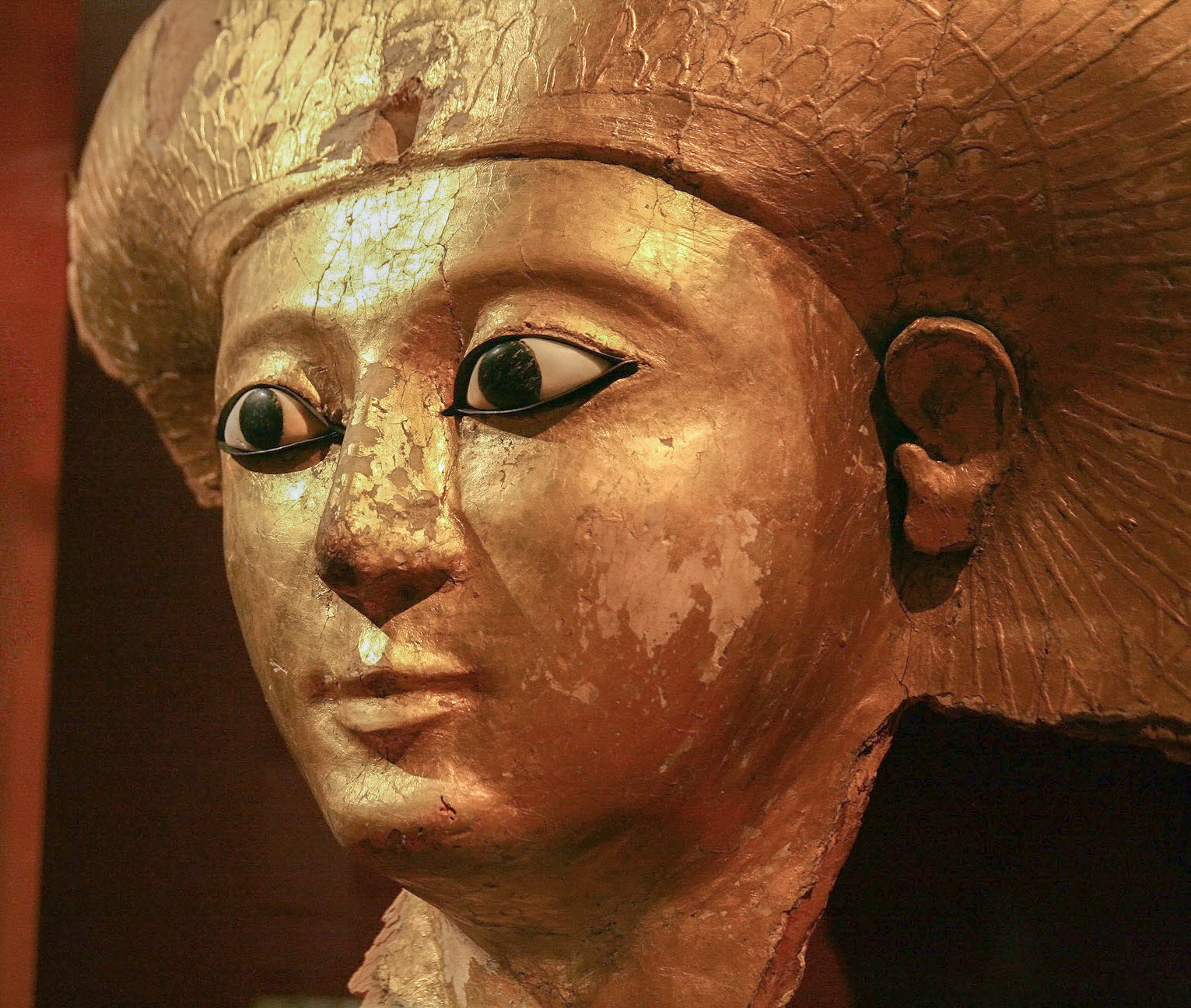
Sarcophagus lid of queen Sitdjehuti (ca 1575 BC)

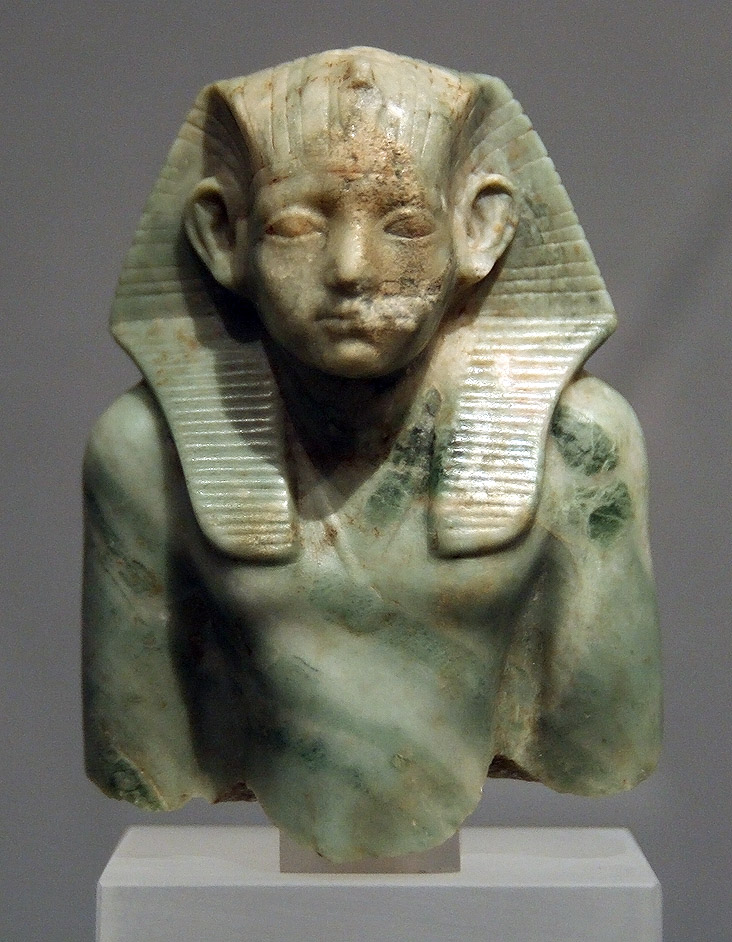
Amenemhet III in young age (ca 1800 BC)

== Children's Education ==
Since 1984, the State Museum of Egyptian Art has offered a children's education program during the summer holidays. It combines a short guided tour with handicraft work that the children can take home. Since 2007 similar programs are also offered during the other school holidays. During the summer holidays and special project days (International Museum Day, Long Night of the Museums), children can complete a Treasure Hunt, answering questions about objects throughout the museum, and receive a prize for correct answers. Outside of the holidays, the museum offers an "Archaeological Backpack" based on a similar principle and that can be taken out at the front desk. Both the Treasure Hunt and the Archaeological Backpack are usually also available in English.

The Museum also offers guided tours for schools on the following subjects:

- Ancient Egyptian Culture
- The Gods of Ancient Egypt
- Funerary Beliefs
- The Secret of the Hieroglyphs
- Everyday and Family Life
- The King and the State
- Animals and their importance to the Egyptians.

The guided tours cost €33 and are available in English and French as well.

Since the beginning of the 2008-2009 school year, schools can book a project hour in addition to guided tours.

== Exhibitions ==
The exhibition "ISISBLUT UND STEINBOCKHORN - Amulett und Talisman in Altägypten und im Alpenraum", an exhibition showing amulets and talismans from Ancient Egypt and the Alps, was on view from 22 July 2010 to 9 January 2011.

== See also ==
- List of museums of Egyptian antiquities
