= Palazzo del Banco Mediceo =

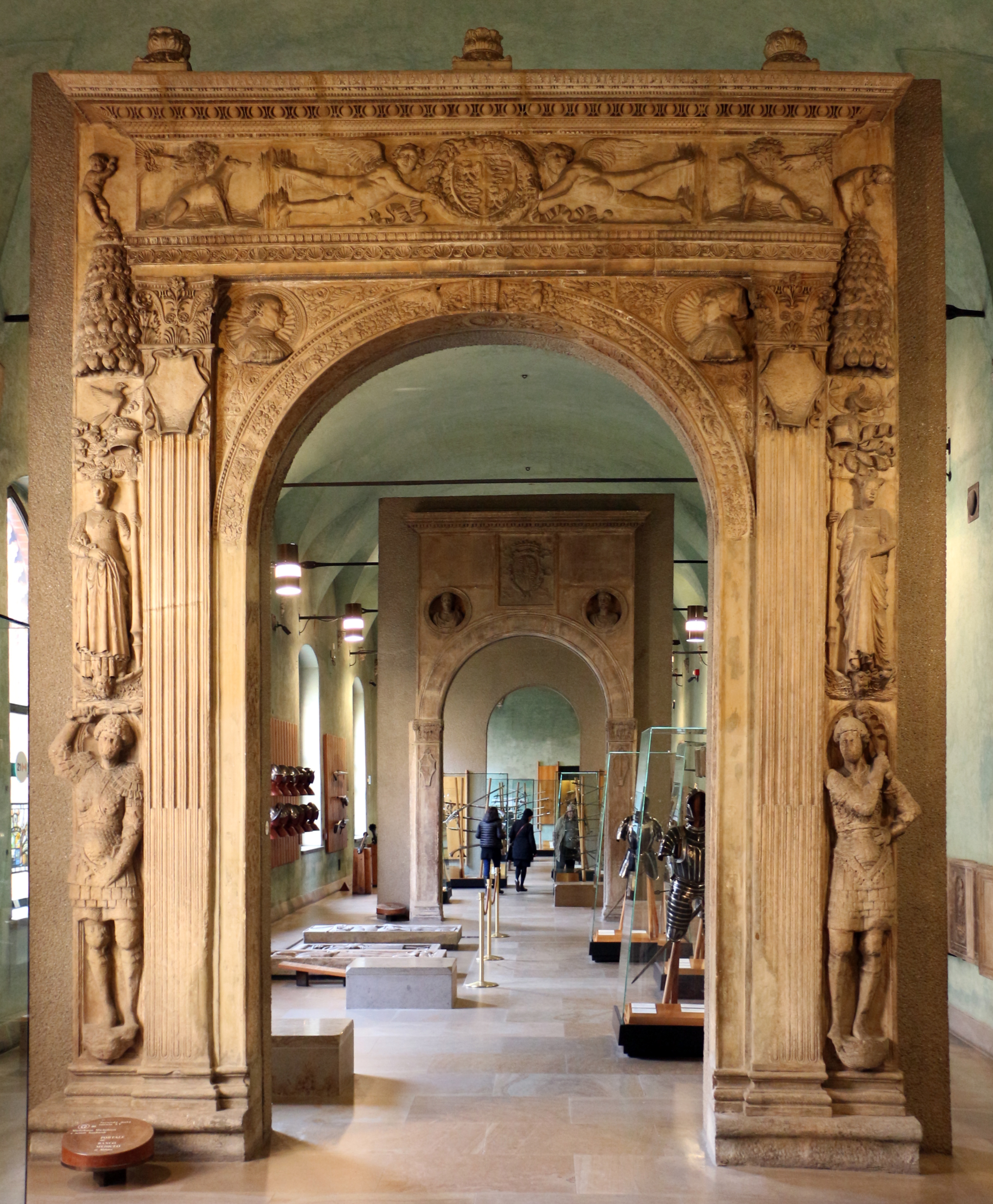
- Portal of the palace, now in the Castello Sforzesco Collections
- Alternative names: Banco Mediceo

General information
- Status: Demolished
- Type: Palace
- Architectural style: Renaissance
- Location: Milan, Italy, Via dei Bossi
- Construction started: XVth century

The Palazzo del Banco Mediceo or simply Banco Mediceo, was a palace in Milan, the Milanese seat of the Medici's financial exchange activities, known throughout Europe as the Medici Bank. It was one of the earliest examples of Lombard Renaissance architecture.

== History ==
The palace was located in Via dei Bossi, in the sestiere di Porta Comasina, where the Teatro alla Scala would later be built. The patron was Pigello Portinari, representative of the Medici family in the Sforzesca Milan. The building in some way sanctioned an alliance, which closed centuries of enmity between Milan and Florence, between Francesco Sforza, who in 1455 donated a pre-existing building destined to be transformed into the seat of the Banco and Cosimo de' Medici, who ordered his representative to build a new and representative palace to honour the city of Milan. The work was carried out rapidly and was completed around 1459.

The appearance of the building is known to us from Filarete's treatise, which contains, in addition to some news, an engraving illustrating the main façade that featured innovative elements of the Tuscan Renaissance, combined with more traditional elements of Milanese architectural practice. The palace shows a symmetrical façade with an ashlar base, a monumental portal, a piano nobile with paired windows set on another cornice, crowning the building with an antique-style cornice. The building also had rich decoration, including ceramic roundels placed just below the cornice. The building’s designer is not known with certainty, although the traditional attribution, though without documentary evidence, is that of Michelozzo, a trusted architect of the Medici family. Recently the attribution to Filarete prevails, assisted by local craftsmen. However, Filarete does not attribute the project to himself in the pages of his treatise.

Around 1456, the loggia and rooms were decorated, again according to Filarete, by the greatest Lombard artist of the time, Vincenzo Foppa, with frescoes with an exceptionally profane subject of which only a fragment with Child reading Cicero|Cicero child reading in the Wallace Collection in London has survived. Other frescoes were by Zanetto Bugatto.

The building was demolished at the end of the 18th century during urban development around the teatro alla Scala. A monumental portal remains of it, preserved at the Museo d’arte antica in the Museo d’arte antica, characterised by an overabundant Lombard-Tuscan sculptural decoration by Guiniforte Solari and Giovanni Antonio Amadeo. A number of terracotta tondi with antique portraits can be found in the Pinacoteca del Castello Sforzesco.

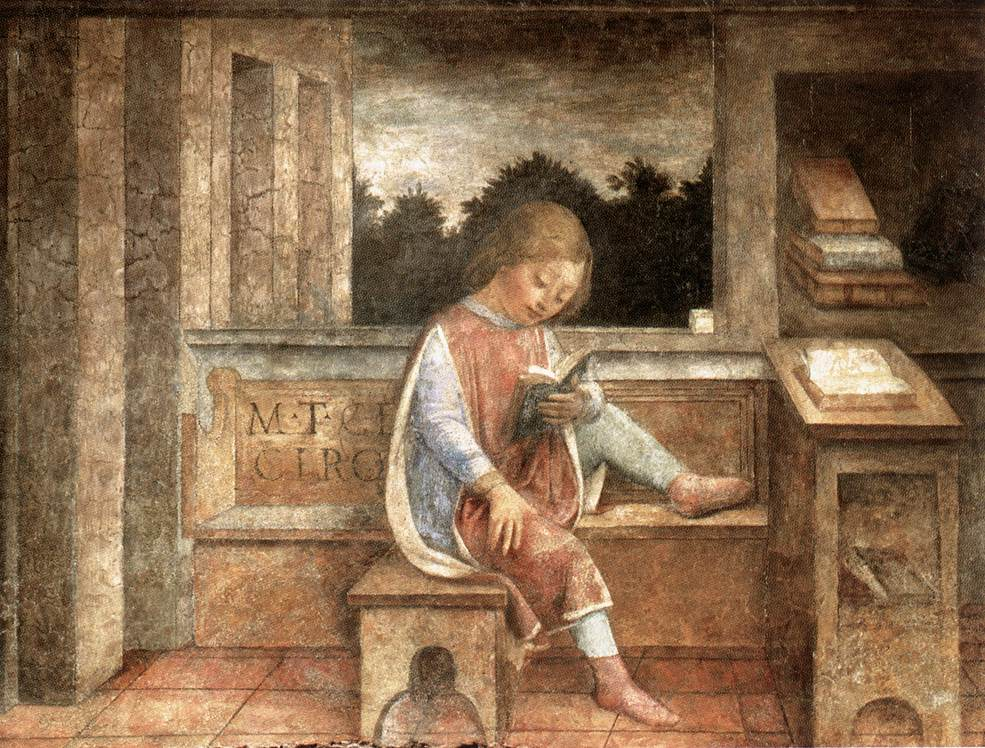
The fragment of a fresco by Vincenzo Foppa, now in the Wallace Collection

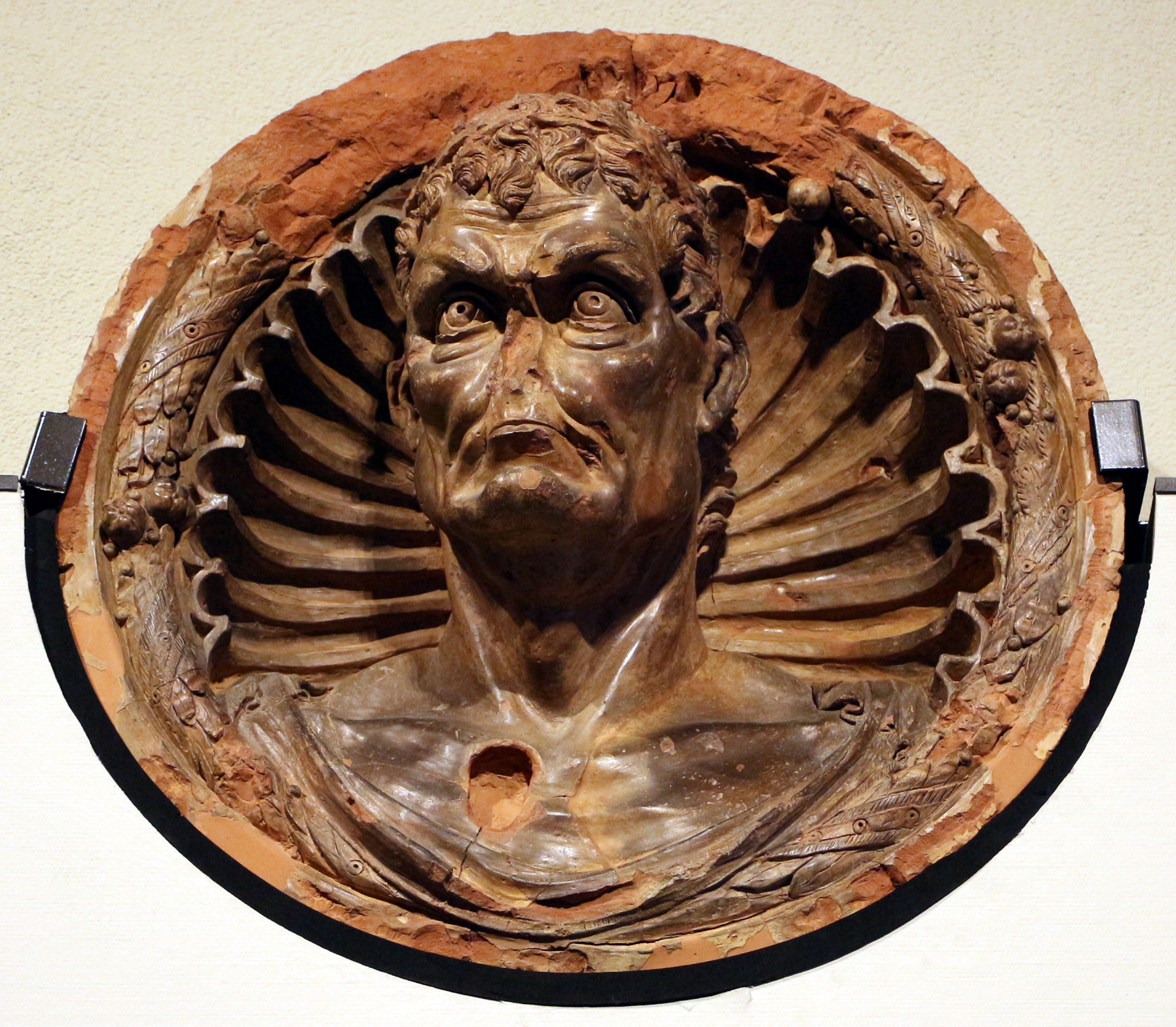
Lombard sculptor, medallion with virile bust of an emperor or other emblematic figure, c. 1485, from the facade of the palace, now in the Castello Sforzesco in Milan

== Bibliography ==
=== Italian sources ===
- A. M. Finoli e L. Grassi, Filarete 1972 Antonio Averlino detto il Filarete, Trattato di architettura, Polifilo, Milano 1972, pp. 698-704.
- J. Gritti, «al modo che s’usa oggi dì in Firenze, all’anticha»: il palazzo di Cosimo Medici a Milano, “Annali di architettura”, 30, 2018, pp. 21-44.
- F. C. Panini, Il libro d’ore di Lorenzo de’ Medici. Volume di commento, Volume 501, Modena, 2005, p. 24.
