= Museum of Musical Instruments (Milan) =

Coordinates: 45°28′14″N 9°10′43″E

Civico Museo degli Strumenti Musicali
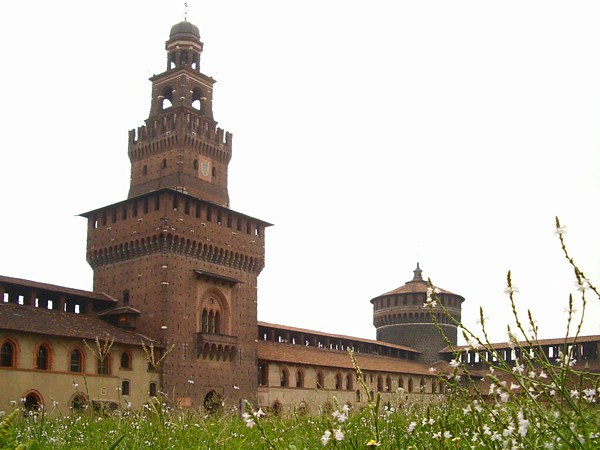
- Sforza Castle
- Location: Piazza Castello 3, 20121, Milan, Italy
- Website: www.milanocastello.it/ing/home.html

The Museum of Musical Instruments of Milan exhibits over 700 musical instruments from the fifteenth to twentieth centuries with particular attention to Lombard instruments. The collection contains plucked instruments, Lombard and Cremonese violins, hunting horns, numerous wood instruments (e.g. flutes, oboes, clarinets, English horns), bassoons, pianos and some ancient organs. In particular the Cremonese lutherie (from Cremona in low Lombardy) is appreciated all over the world for the high quality of its musical instruments. The museum also displays the equipment of the former Studio di fonologia musicale di Radio Milano.

In 2000 a donation by the Fondazione Antonio Monzino added 79 musical instruments, made between the 18th and 20th century, to the civic collection; they had been collected by the Monzino family. These musical instruments represent the strong tradition of Lombard lutherie.

The museum is situated in the Sforza Castle complex that also includes The Museum of Ancient Art, the Pinacotheca, the Applied Arts Collection and the Egyptian Museum (that includes the prehistoric sections of the Archaeological Museum of Milan).

== Gallery ==
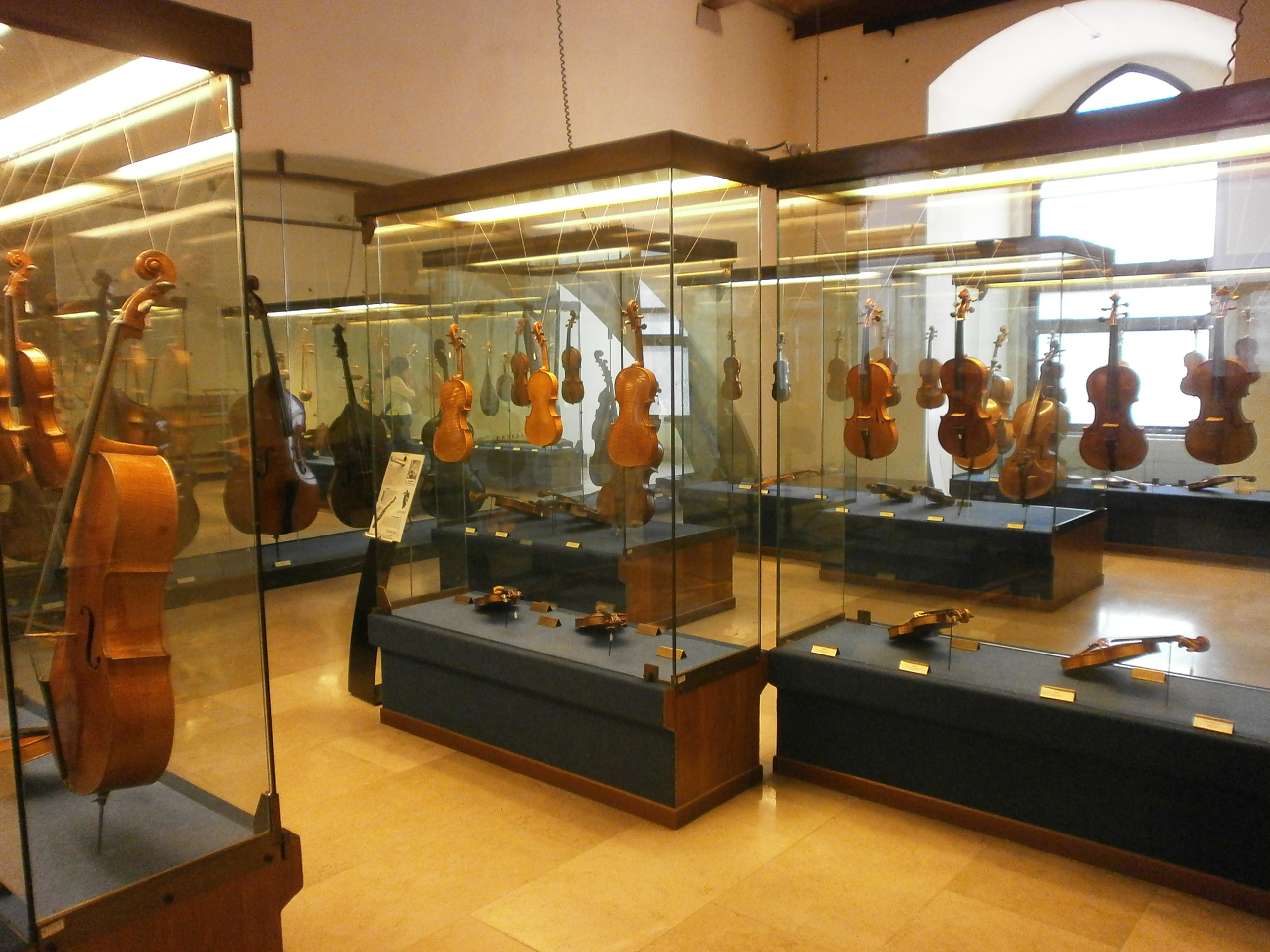
A room of the museum

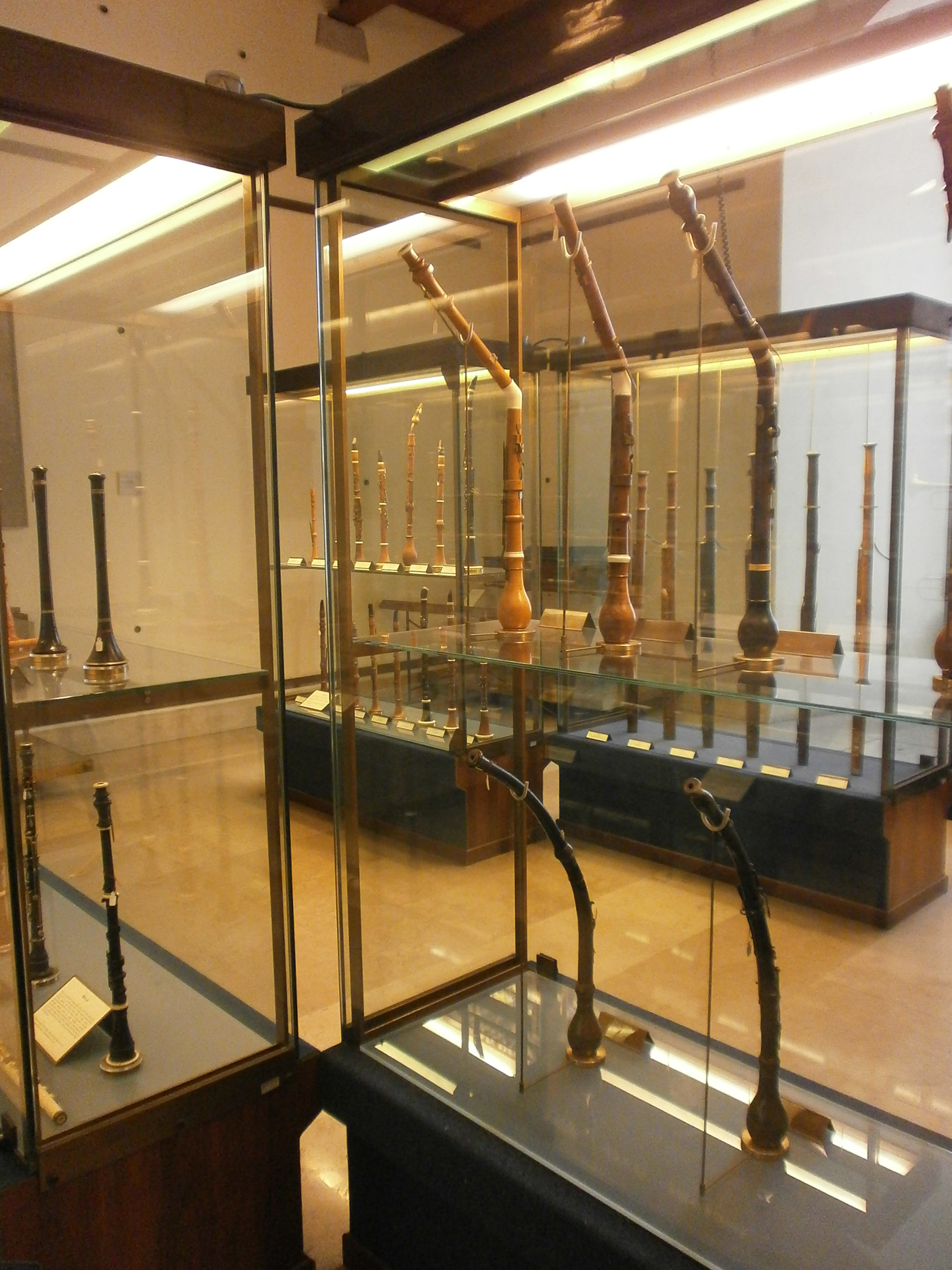
The wind instruments hall

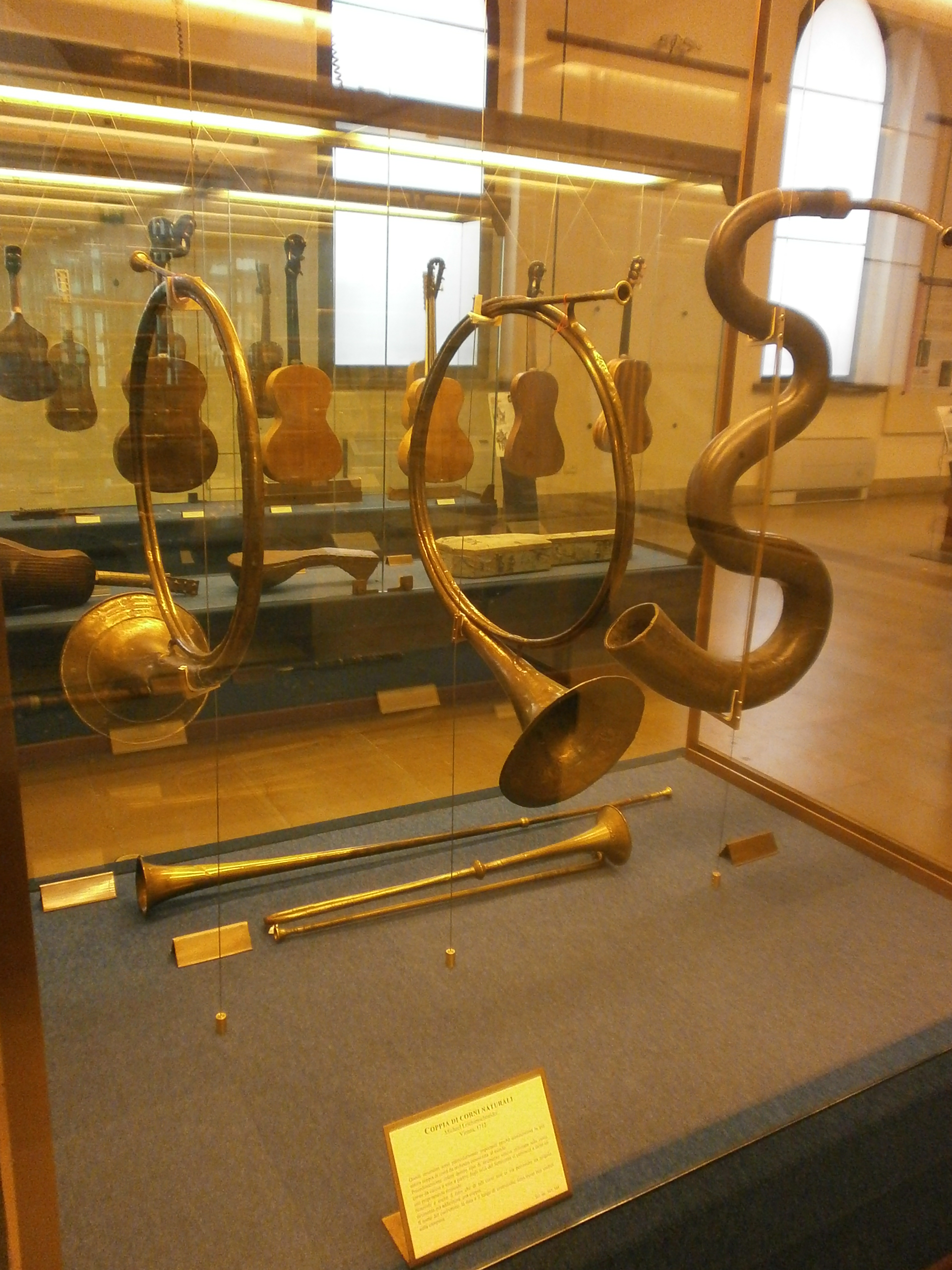
Horns, Michael Leichamschneider, Vienna 1712

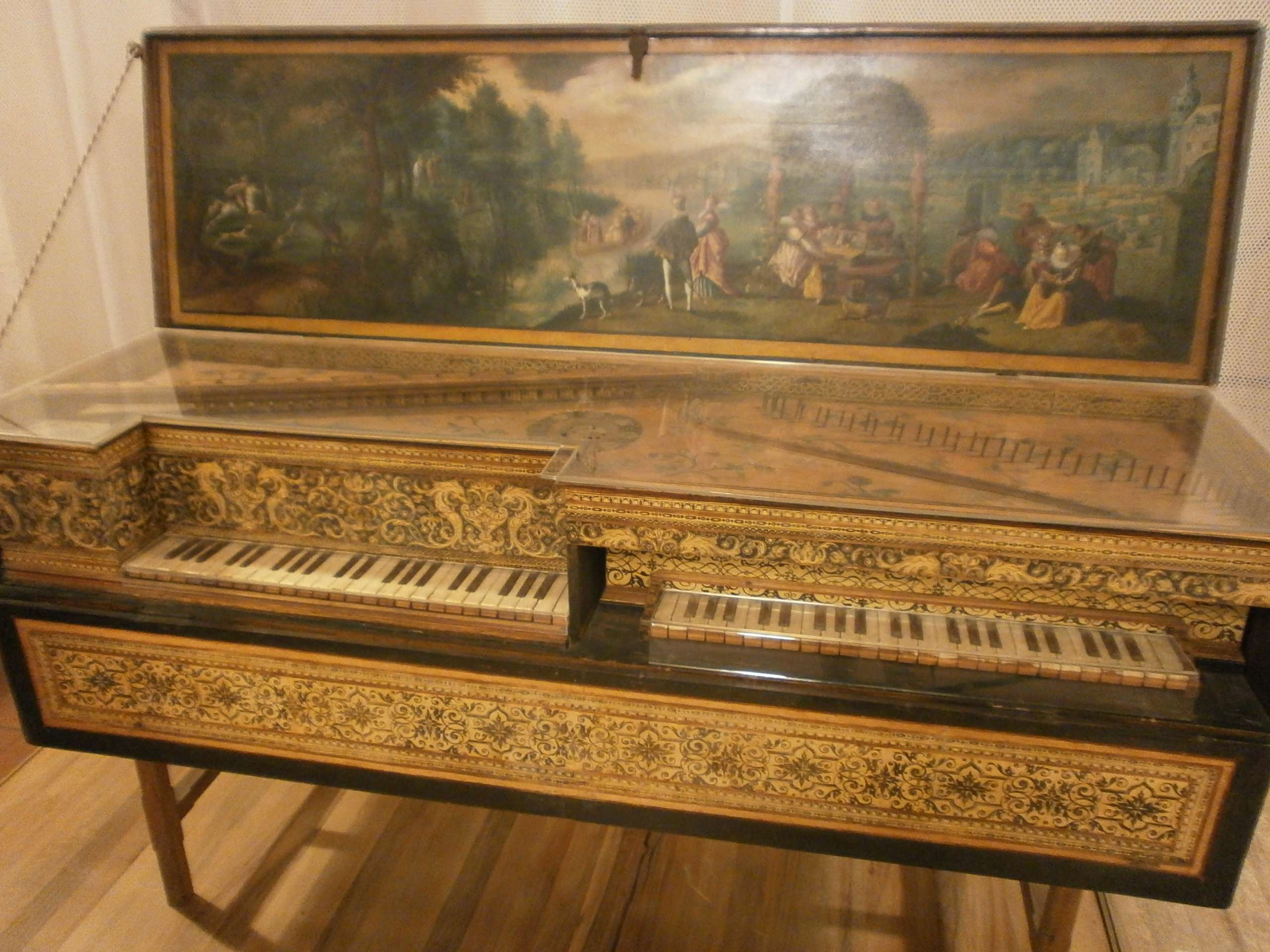
Virginal, Ioannes Ruckers, Antwerp 1600

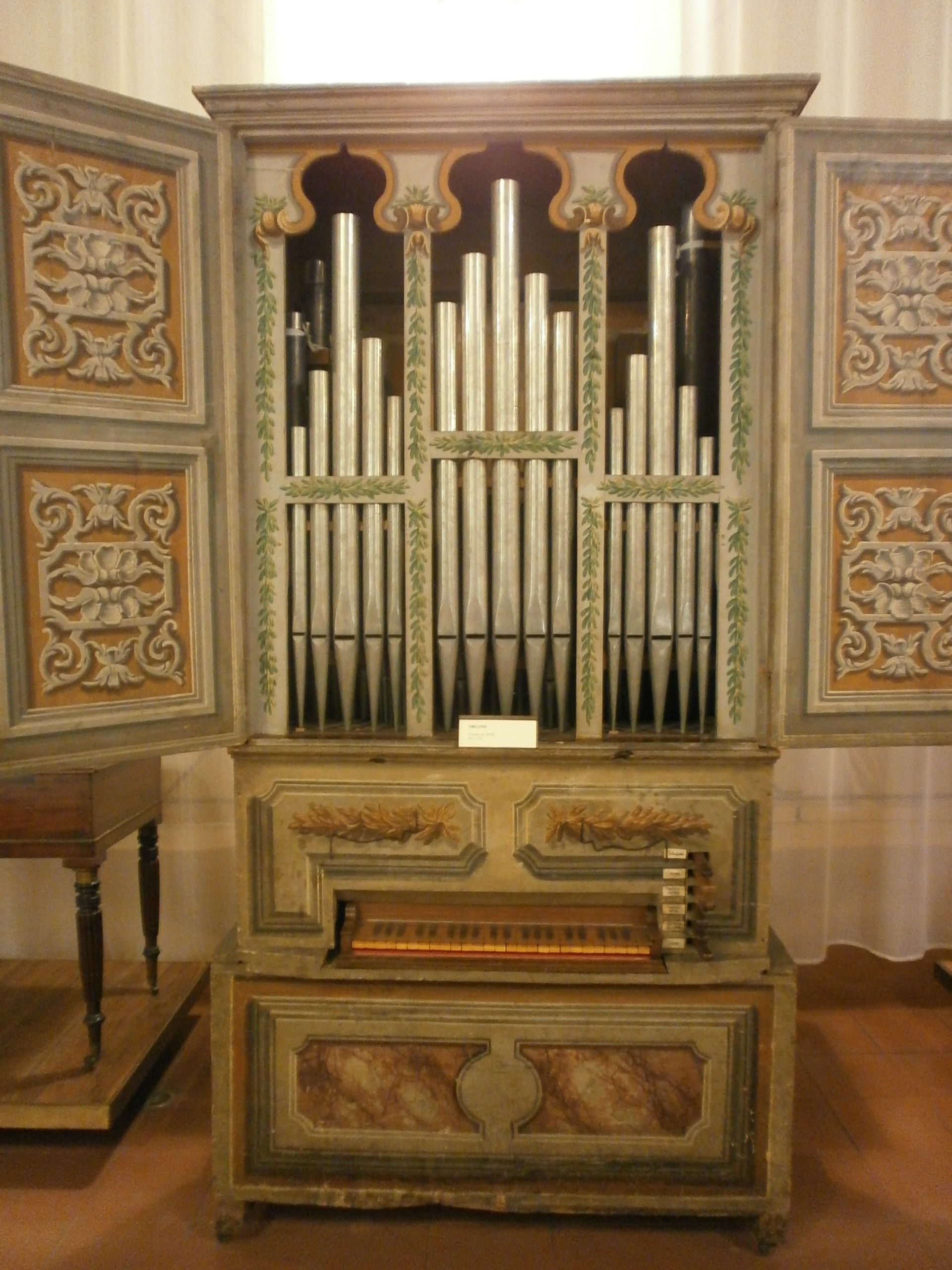
Organ, Tuscany, XVIII

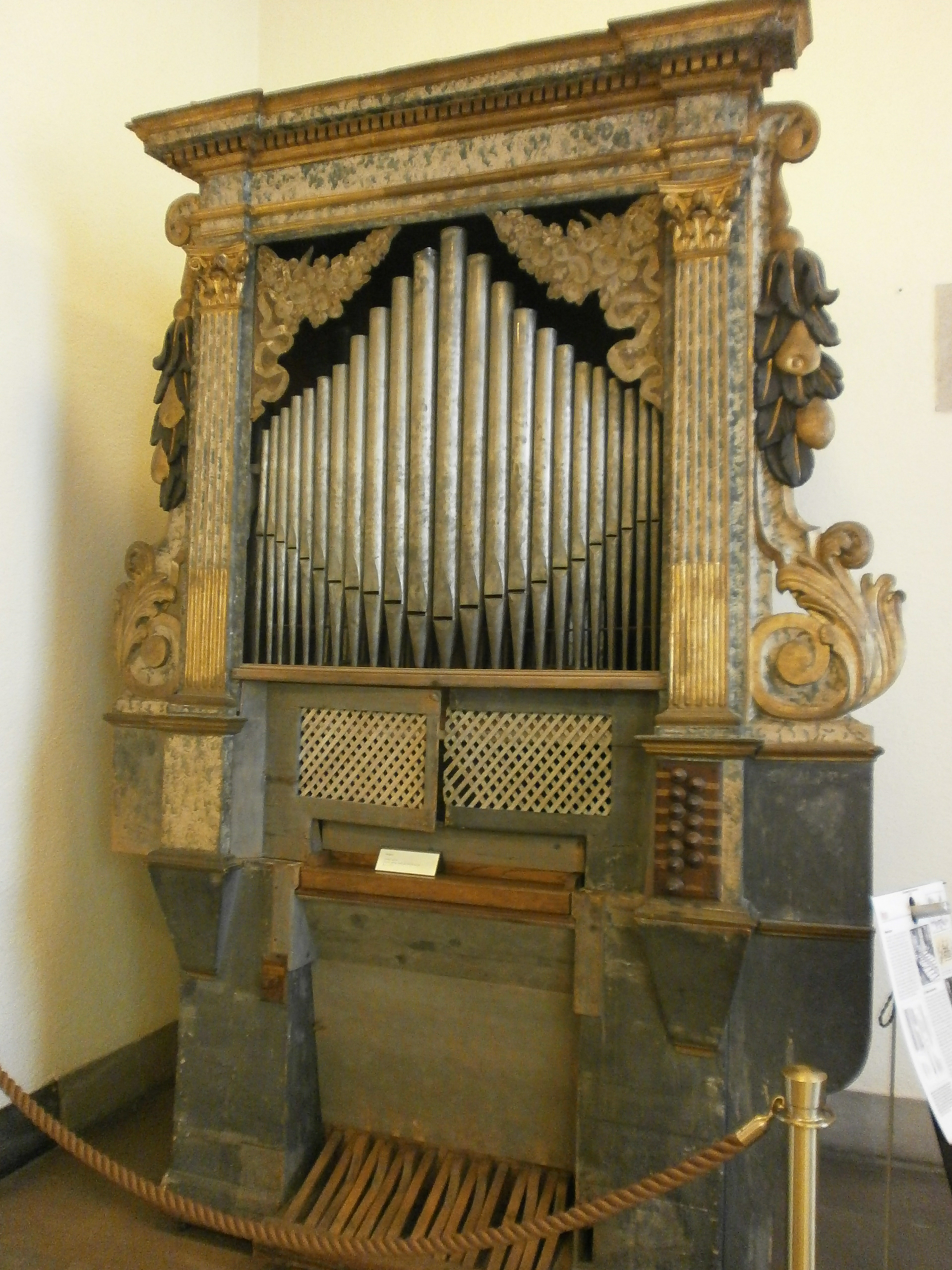
Organ, Emilia, XVIII

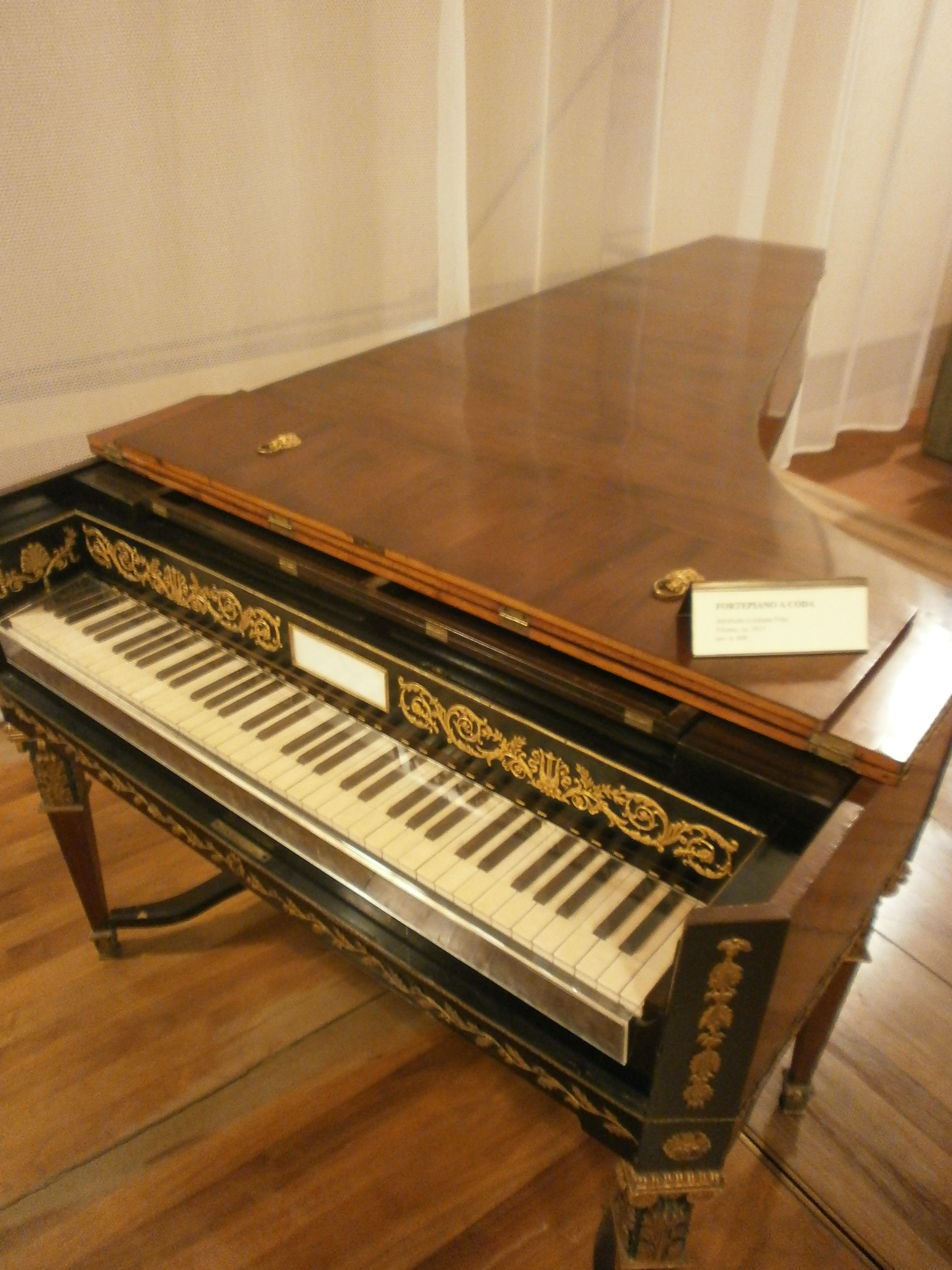
Piano, Johann Fritz, Vienna 1815

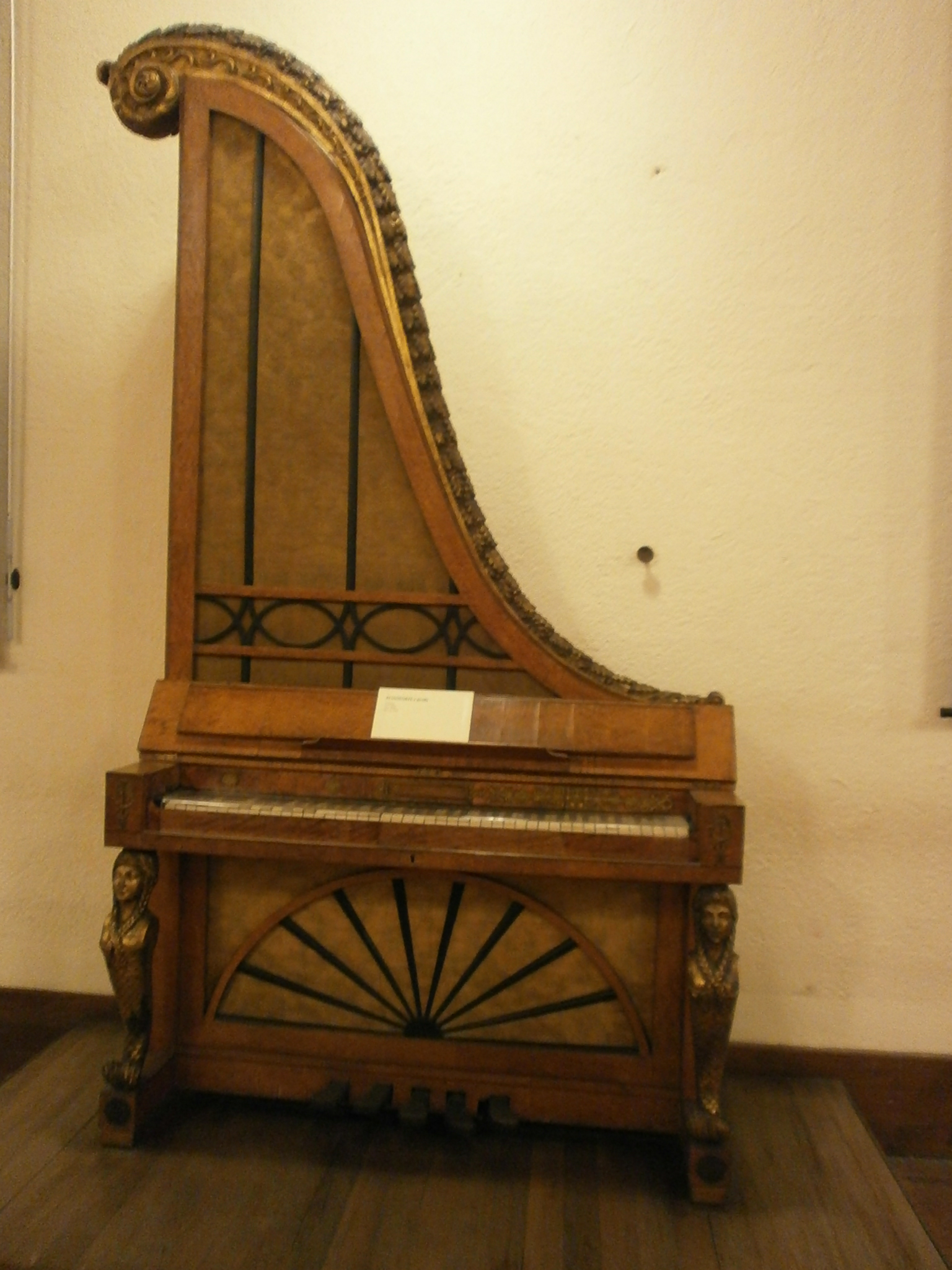
Giraffe piano, Vienna, 19th century

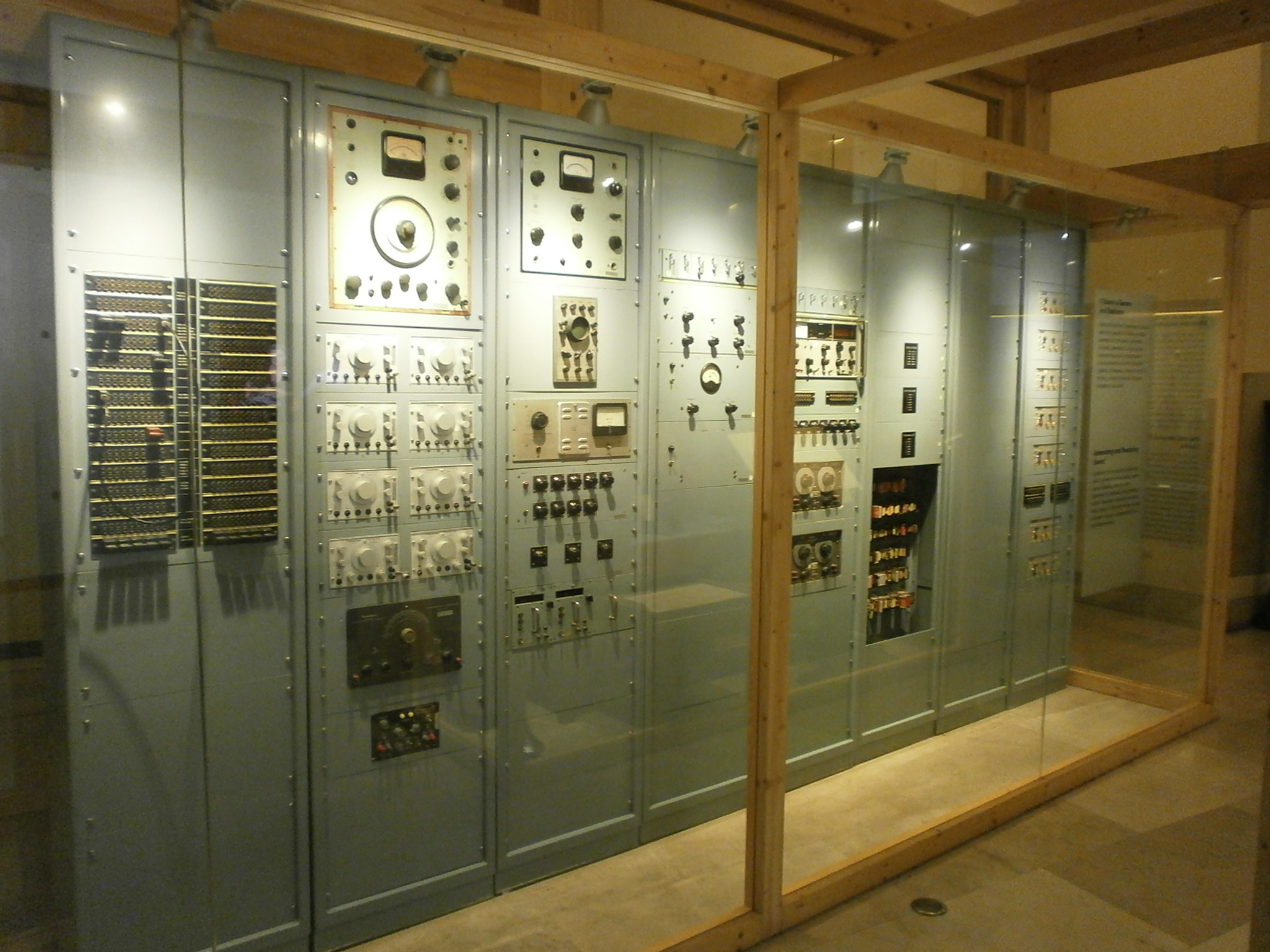
Synthesizer

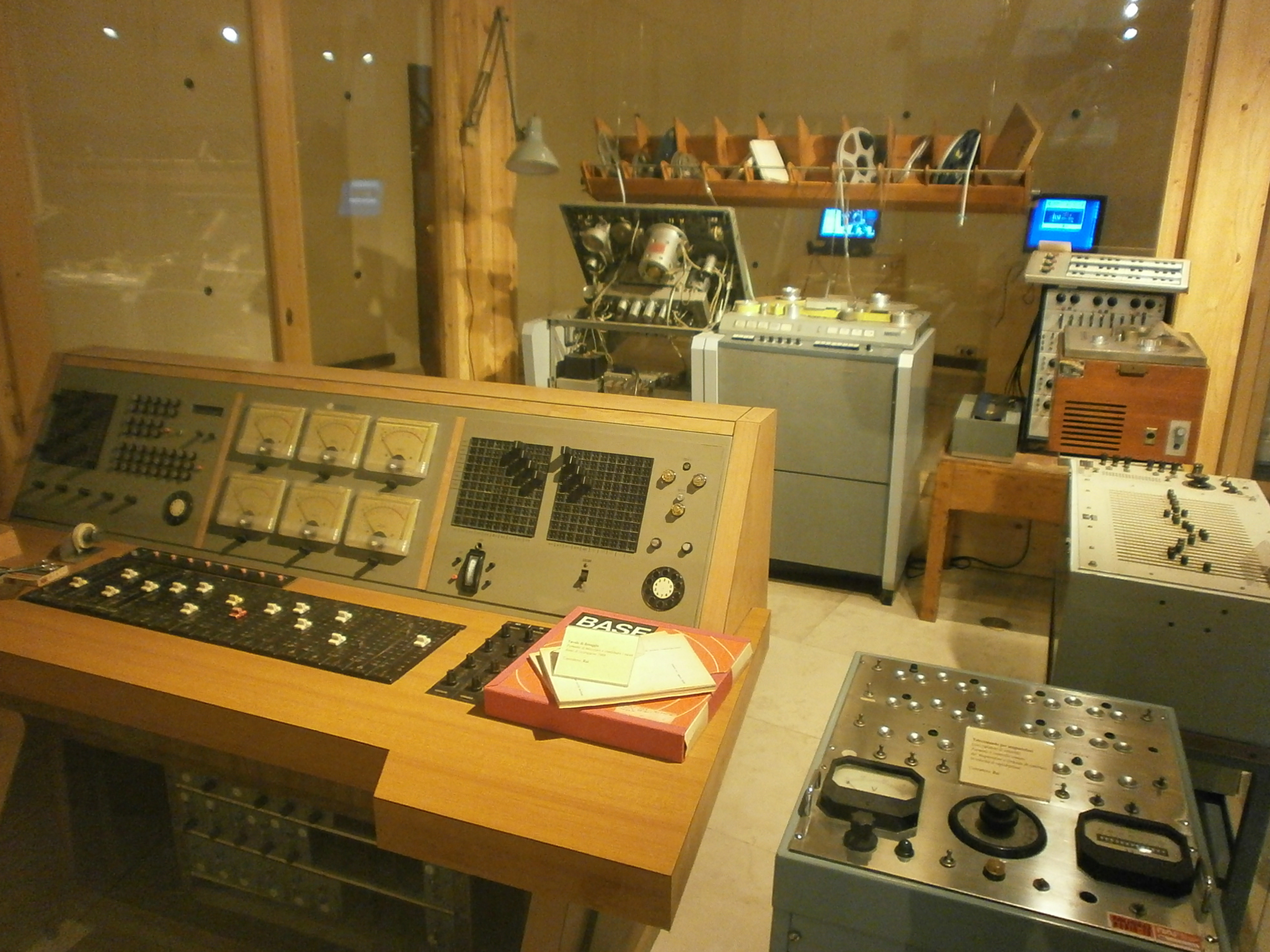
Audio console

== See also ==
- List of music museums
