= Johann Fritz (piano maker) =

- Died: 1834
- Occupation: Piano maker

Johann Peter Fritz was a piano maker based in Vienna. He was one of Vienna's most distinguished piano makers. His pianos were valued for good quality and melodiousness. It is known, that Giuseppe Verdi was very fond of Johann Fritz's pianos and used the Viennese 6-pedal Fritz piano from the time of Rigoletto in 1851 to Aida in 1871. This exact piano can be seen in the composer's Villa Verdi in Province of Piacenza in Italy.

After Johann Fritz's death, his son Joseph (born in Vienna, 1808), continued the firm, apparently under the original name. He seemed to have moved his workshop to Graz in the late 1830s, after 1837.

Some of Johann Fritz's instruments survived until today and are presented in museums such as The Museum of Musical Instruments in Milan, The Museum of Fine Arts in Boston, and the Finchcocks Museum in Tunbridge Wells, Kent.

Fritz died in 1834 in Vienna.

Recordings made with original Fritz pianos

- Chiara Banchini, Ensemble 415. Johann Schobert. Quatuors, Trios, Sonates. Label: Harmonia Mundi France
- Richard Burnett. G. Farnaby, J. S. Bach, T. Arne, J. Stanley, J. Haydn, W. A. Mozart, L. van Beethoven, J. C. Bach, J. L. Dussek, F. Schubert, M. Clementi, J. Field, F. Chopin, F. Mendelssohn. The Finchcocks Collection of Historic Keyboard Instruments. Label: Amon Ra. Fritz fortepiano used for Mozart's Rondo Alla turca and the dances by Schubert.
- Howard Shelley. Franz Schubert. Piano Sonatas Op. 78 in G, D. 894 & Op. posth. 143 in A minor, D. 784. Label: Amon Ra
- Marcus Creed, RIAS Kammerchor. Franz Schubert. Nachtgesang. Label: Harmonia Mundi
- Andreas Staier. Franz Schubert. The Late Piano Sonatas, D. 958-960. Label: Teldec
- Markus Schäfer, Tobias Koch. Franz Schubert, Ludwig Berger. Die schöne Müllerin. Label: Avi-Music
- Hans Jorg Mammel, Arthur Schoonderwoerd. Franz Schubert. Winterreise. Label: Alpha
- Arthur Schoonderwoerd, Cristofori. Ludwig van Beethoven. Concerti 4 & 5 pour le pianoforte avec accompagnement d'orchestre. Label: Alpha
- Arthur Schoonderwoerd, Cristofori. Ludwig van Beethoven. Concerti 3 & 6 pour le pianoforte avec accompagnement d'orchestre. Label: Alpha (Fritz fortepiano used for Op. 61a)
- Andreas Staier, Concerto Köln, Rainer Kussmaul. Mendelssohn. Piano Concerto in A minor, Concerto for Piano and Violin in D minor. Label: Teldec
- Christoph Prégardien, Andreas Staier. Mendelssohn. Songs and Duets.
- Charles Neidich, Robert D. Levin. Danzi, Mendelssohn, Weber. Clarinet Sonatas. Label: Sony
- Trio Margaux. Chopin, Elsner. Fortepiano Trios. Label: Hänssler (Fritz fortepiano used for Chopin's Piano Trio)
- Anneke Scott, Steven Devine. Ludwig van Beethoven. Beyond Beethoven: Works for natural horn and fortepiano. Label: Resonus
