= Achille Bertarelli =

Italian art collector and art historian

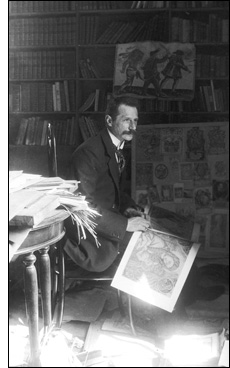
- Born: 12 November 1863; Milan, Italy
- Died: 20 May 1938 (aged 74); Rome, Italy
- Education: University of Milan, University of Bologna
- Occupations: Art collector, Art historian

Achille Bertarelli (12 November 1863 – 20 May 1938) was an Italian art collector and art historian born in Milan.

== Biography ==
Achille Bertarelli was born in Milan in 1863. He was the son of Pier Giuseppe Bertarelli and Carolina Nessi and the brother of the geographer and speleologist Luigi Vittorio Bertarelli.

He studied law at the University of Milan and at the University of Bologna, graduating in 1888. Along with his brothers, he took over the family candle factory, which they transformed into a religious art objects factory named "Fabbrica di Arredi Sacri F.lli Bertarelli" after their father's death.

In 1894, his brother Luigi Vittorio Bertarelli founded the Touring Club Ciclistico Italiano (now the Touring Club Italiano).

Achille Bertarelli's great passion in life was engraving and illustrated books: his personal collection formed the nucleus of the print cabinet in the city of Milan.

In 1897, he founded the Società Bibliografica Italiana with Giuseppe Fumagalli, then director of the Brera in Milan, of which he served as vice president until World War I, during which the association was dissolved.

Highly involved in Milanese cultural life, he participated in the organization of several local events, including the "Retrospective Exhibition of Communications, Travels, and Transport" accompanying the IVth Italian Geographical Congress in 1901, which was repeated in 1906 to mark the completion of the Simplon Tunnel.

In 1938, he contracted the flu which developed into pneumonia: Achille Bertarelli passed away in Rome on May 20, 1838.

== Print Collector ==
In 1890, he began his career as a collector, focusing primarily on popular prints and ephemera. It was not so much their artistic value that interested him, but rather their documentary and ethnographic significance. His collection was organized into several categories: Historical Prints, Customs and Traditions, Theater, Popular Literature and Iconography, Means of Transport, Arts and Crafts, Commerce and Advertising, small prints of personal subjects, book ornaments, and colored papers.

The purchase in 1893 of part of the holdings of the famous Remondini press in Bassano del Grappa from the publisher Menegazzi significantly enriched Bertarelli's fledgling collection. The collector then possessed a representative set of the production of the most important Italian print publisher of the 18th century.

In 1905, Achille Bertarelli published the first inventory of his collection, with the aim of making it known to historians and art historians. Indeed, the collector readily opened the doors of his home on Via San Barnaba to those wishing to study his prints, which were classified to form an "iconographic archive." This first catalog was titled Spiegazione e stato numerico delle raccolte del Dr. A. Bertarelli al 1º gennaio 1905.

In 1924, Bertarelli expressed his wish to donate his collection to the city of Milan. The project led to the creation in 1927 of the Civica Raccolta Stampe of Milan housed in the Sforza Castle. About 300,000 pieces from Bertarelli were transferred to the municipality. After this donation, Achille Bertarelli continued to actively participate in the life of the print cabinet, making numerous donations of new pieces and encouraging the research efforts of scholars frequenting the new institution. Upon his death in 1938, the municipality renamed the collection Civica Raccolta delle Stampe "Achille Bertarelli" in his honor, recognizing his role as founder. The cabinet then preserved 400,000 pieces.

The prints donated by Achille Bertarelli to the city are recognizable by his AB stamp (Lugt 73), which he affixed to each piece. In his dictionary of collection marks, Fritz Lugt indicates that "to avoid the chances of theft, Bertarelli trims all his prints 1 cm. outside the engraved part, considering this removes their commercial value while preserving their documentary interest."

== Historian of Popular Prints ==
Through his works and collector efforts, he was one of the main initiators of Italian investigations into popular prints. He contributed, along with Novati, to the conception of the section on popular iconography at the Italian Ethnography Exhibition of 1911.

His pioneering research found a favorable reception in French intellectual circles: his work on Italian popular imagery was first published in Paris in 1929. It was only later translated into Italian.

== Italian History and Ephemera Collection ==
In addition to prints, Achille Bertarelli assembled an important collection of popular literature works and ephemera. Part of this collection was donated during his lifetime to the National Library of Brera. It served as material for several of his publications.

He sought to document the history of the Risorgimento through brochures, newspapers, and leaflets, all previously neglected sources. This set of 35,000 documents was donated in 1925 to the Museum of the Risorgimento in Milan.

Achille Bertarelli also assembled a collection of 20,000 documents related to World War I, mainly composed of news sheets, propaganda pamphlets, trench newspapers, and postcards.

== Selected works ==
- Achille Bertarelli, Henry Prior, Gli ex libris italiani, Milan, 1902.
- Iconografia napoleonica : 1796-1799 : ritratti di Bonaparte incisi in Italia ed all'estero da originali italiani, Milan, 1903.
- Achille Bertarelli, Henry Prior, Il biglietto da visita italiano. Contributo alla storia del costume e dell'incisione nel sec.XVIII, Bergamo, 1911.
- Catalogo: Inventario della raccolta donata da Achille Bertarelli al Commune di Milano: risorgimento italiano, 3 vol., Bergamo, 1925
- Achille Bertarelli, Antonio Monti, Tre secoli di vita milanese nei documenti iconografici. 1630 à 1875, Milan, 1927.
- L'imagerie populaire italienne, Paris, 1929.
- Achille Bertarelli, Paolo Arrigoni, Le carte geografiche dell'Italia, Milan, 1930.
- Achille Bertarelli, Paolo Arrigoni, Piante e Vedute della Lombardia, Milan, 1931.
- Achille Bertarelli, Paolo Arrigoni, Le Stampe storiche conservate Nella raccolta del Castello Sforzesco, Milan, 1932.
- Achille Bertarelli, Timina Caproni Guasti, L'Aeronautica Italiana nell'Immagine 1487-1875, Milan, 1938.
- Le incisioni di GM Mitelli, Milan, 1940 (posthumous)
