= Museo d'Arte Antica =

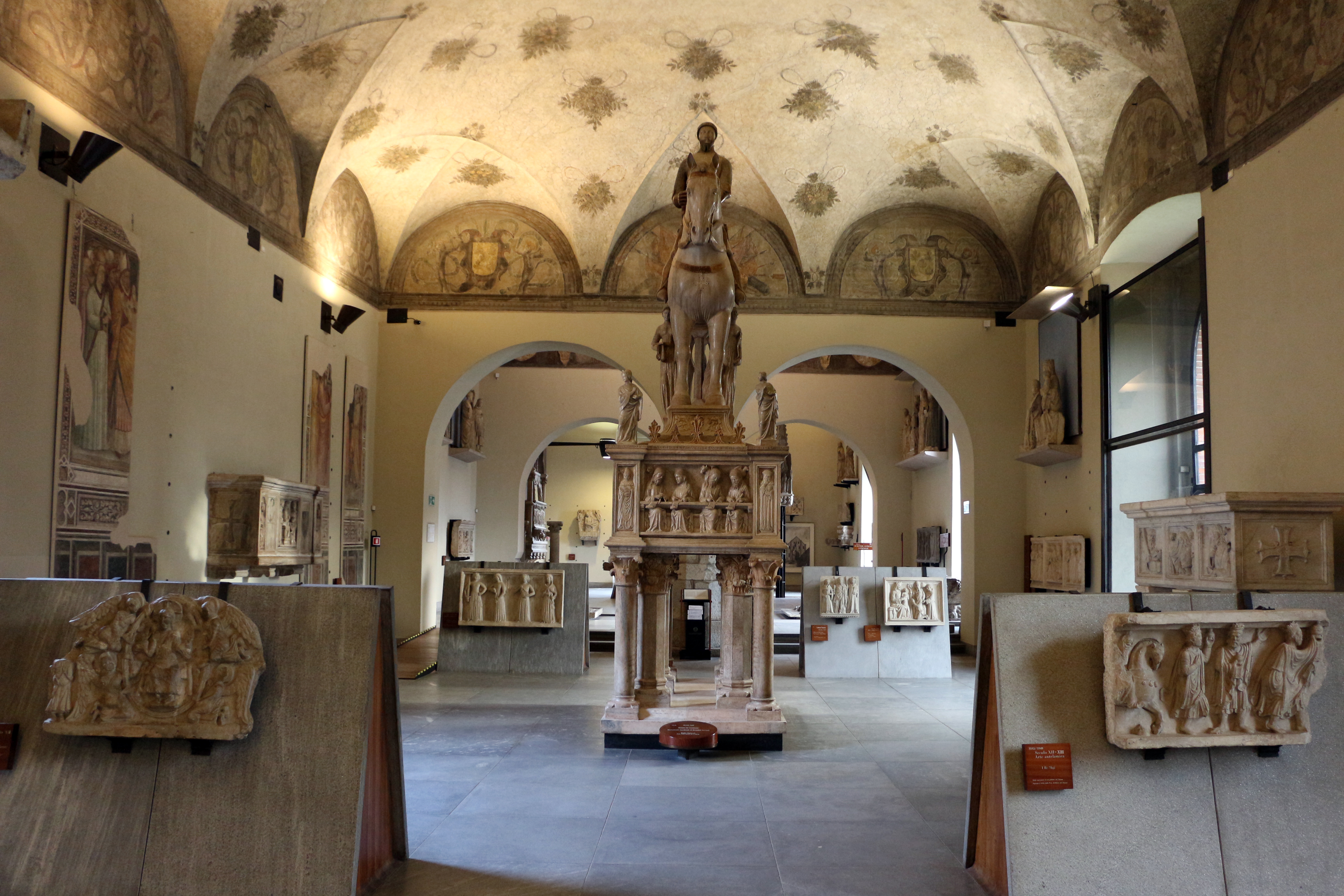
- Sala 2, with the 14th-century Monument to Bernabò Visconti in the centre
- Location: Piazza Castello 3, 20121, Milan, Italy
- Coordinates: 45°28′14″N 9°10′43″E
- Director: Giulia Amato
- Website: arteantica.milanocastello.it

The Museo d'Arte Antica ('Museum of Ancient Art') is an art museum in the Castello Sforzesco in Milan, in Lombardy in northern Italy. It has a large collection of sculpture from late antiquity and the medieval and Renaissance periods. The various frescoed rooms of the museum house an armoury, a tapestry room, some funerary monuments, Michelangelo's Rondanini Pietà and two medieval portals.

The Sala Verde ('green room') displays 15th- and 16th-century sculptures, the collection of arms of the Castello Sforzesco and the Portale del Banco Mediceo, a gate removed from Via Bossi. The collection of arms, in the second part of the room, displays sculptures, armour, swords and firearms in chronological sequence from the Middle Ages to the 18th century.

The Sala delle Asse, designed and frescoed by Leonardo da Vinci at the request of Lodovico il Moro, represents the Sforza period of Milan.

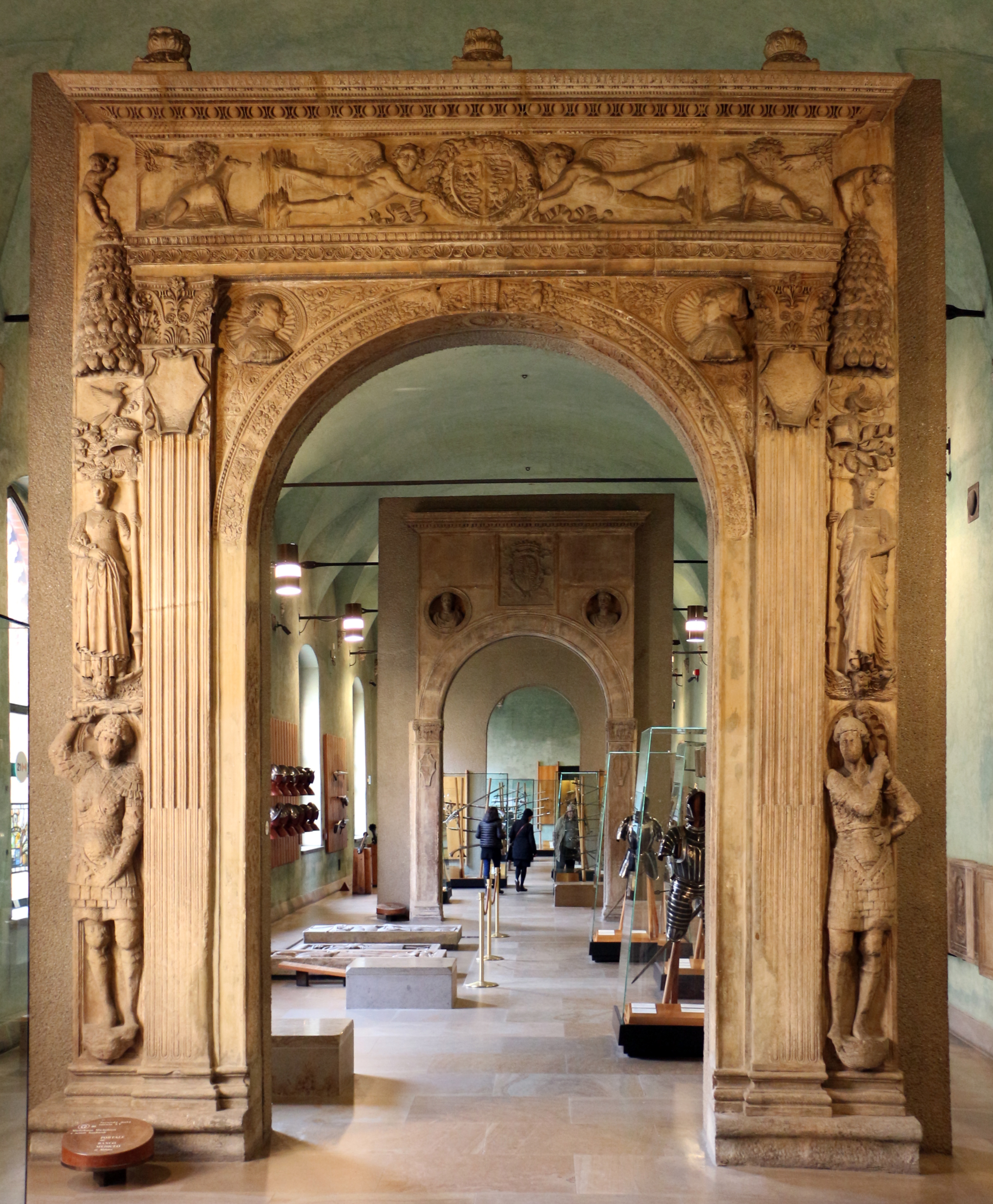
The Portale del Banco Mediceo

== Sources ==
- [various authors] (2003). Milano e provincia (in Italian). Milano: Touring Club Italiano.
- [various authors] (2008). Le città d'arte: Milano (in Italian). Milano: Skira.
