= Sforza Castle =

Castle in Milan, Italy

- Castello Sforzesco (Italian); Castell Sforzesch (Lombard)
- Milan in Italy
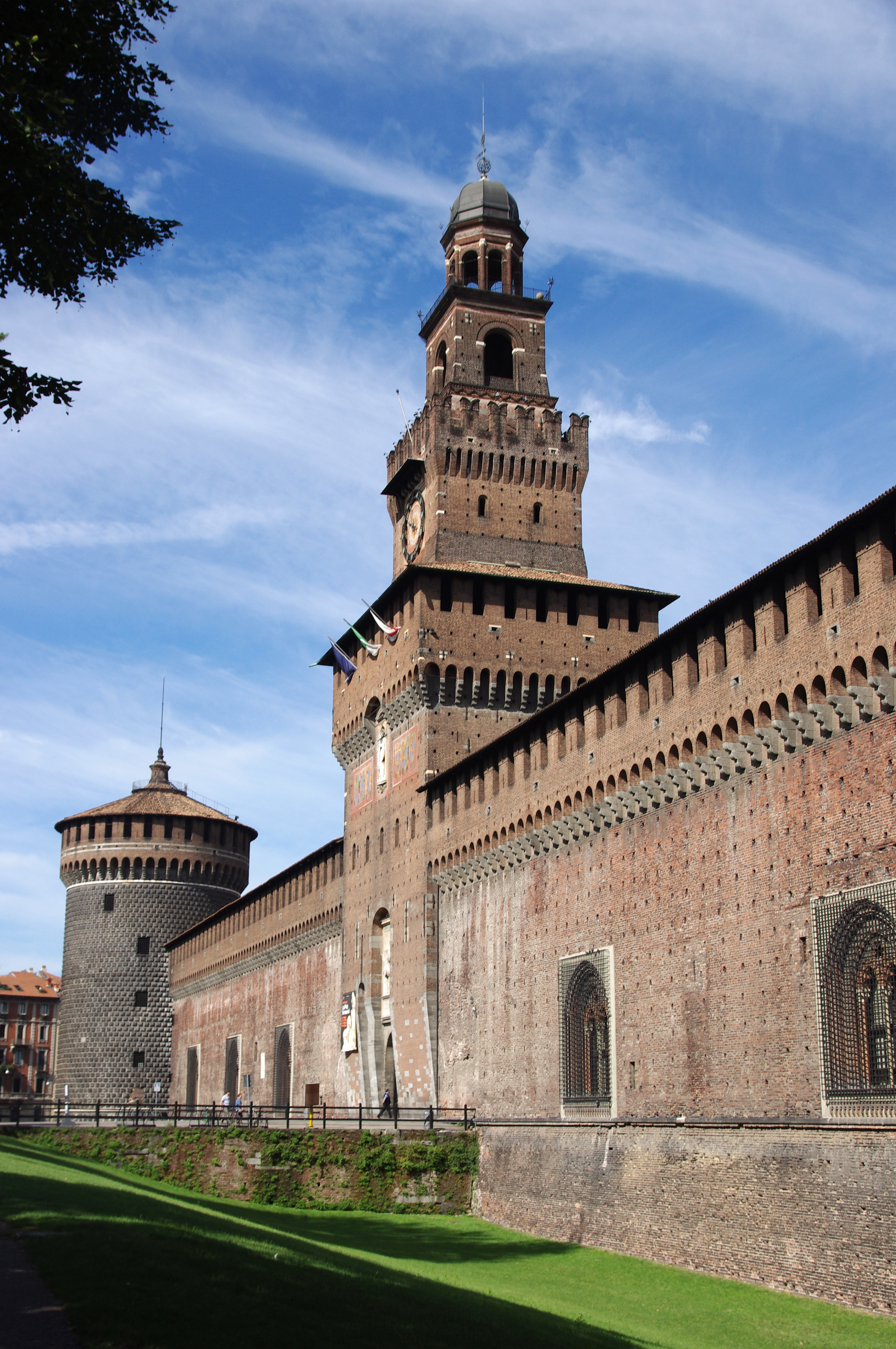
- The Torre del Filarete

Site information
- Owner: Municipality of Milan
- Open to the public: Yes
- Condition: Restored by Luca Beltrami (1891–1905)
- Website: www.milanocastello.it/en

Location
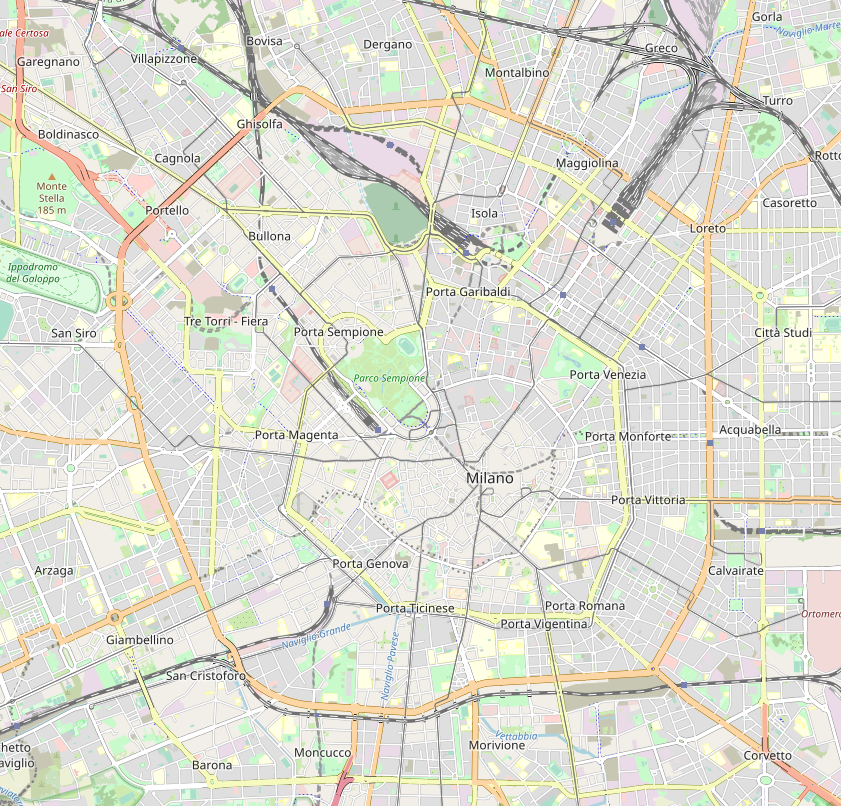
- Location within Milan
- Coordinates: 45°28′12″N 9°10′43″E

Site history
- Built: 1360–1499
- In use: Until 1862

The Sforza Castle (Italian: Castello Sforzesco [kaˈstɛllo sforˈtsesko]; Milanese: Castell Sforzesch [kaˈstɛl sfurˈsɛsk]) is a medieval fortification located in Milan, northern Italy. It was built in the 15th century by Francesco Sforza, Duke of Milan, on the remnants of a 14th-century fortification. Later renovated and enlarged, in the 16th and 17th centuries it was one of the largest citadels in Europe. Extensively rebuilt by Luca Beltrami in 1891–1905, it now houses several of the city's museums and art collections.

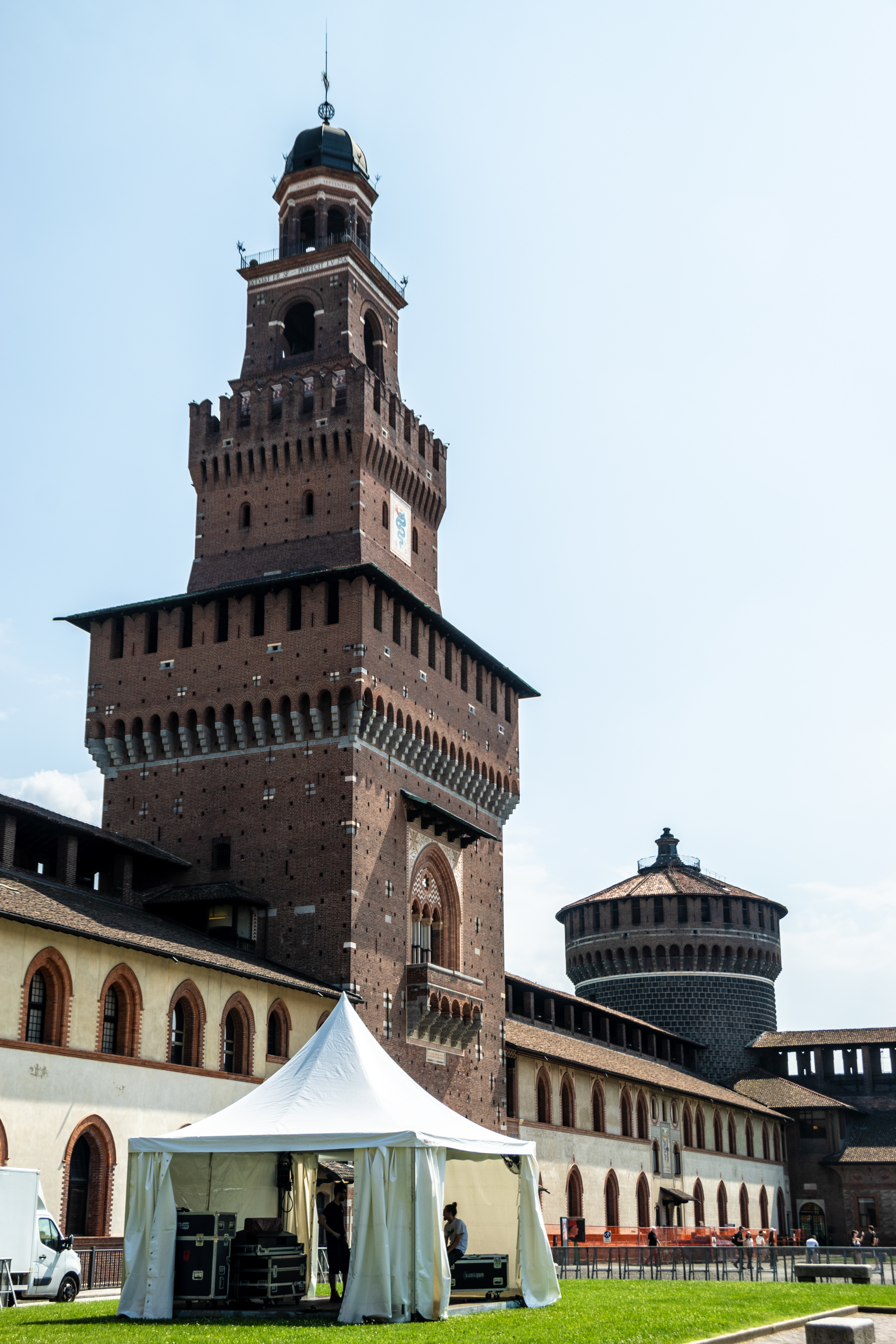
Torre del Filarete from interior of Sforza Castle.

== History ==
The original construction was ordered by Galeazzo II Visconti, a local nobleman, in 1358 – c. 1370; this castle was known as the Castello di Porta Giova (or Porta Zubia), from the name of a gate in walls located nearby. It was built in the same area of the ancient Roman fortification of Castrum Portae Jovis, which served as castra pretoria when the city was the capital of the Roman Empire. It was enlarged by Galeazzo's successors, Gian Galeazzo, Giovanni Maria and Filippo Maria Visconti, until it became a square-plan castle with 200 m-long sides, four towers at the corners and up to 7-metre-thick (23 ft) walls. The castle was the main residence in the city of its Visconti lords, and was destroyed by the short-lived Golden Ambrosian Republic which ousted them in 1447.

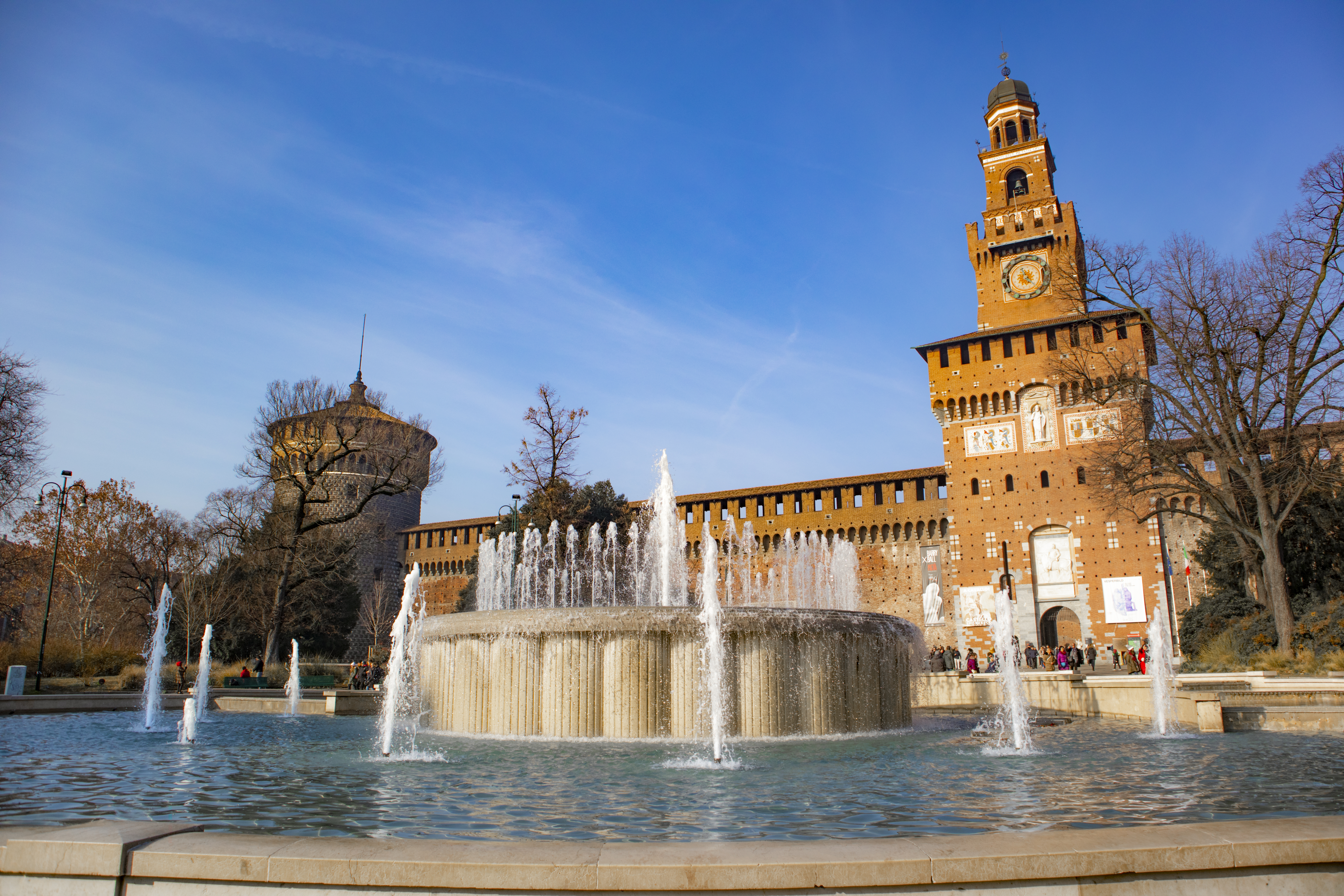
Water fountains in front of the Sforza Castle

In 1450, Francesco Sforza, once he had shattered the republicans, began reconstruction of the castle to turn it into his princely residence. In 1452 he hired the sculptor and architect Filarete to design and decorate the central tower, which is still known as the Torre del Filarete. After Francesco's death, the construction was continued by his son Galeazzo Maria, under the architect Benedetto Ferrini. The decoration was executed by local painters. In 1476, during the regency of Bona of Savoy, the tower bearing her name was built. Architect Pietro Antonio Solari took inspiration from castle while working on Moscow Kremlin in 1485.

In 1494 Ludovico Sforza became lord of Milan, and called on numerous artists to decorate the castle. These include Leonardo da Vinci (who frescoed several rooms, in collaboration with Bernardino Zenale and Bernardino Butinone) and Bramante, who painted frescoes in the Sala del Tesoro; the Sala della Balla was decorated with Francesco Sforza's deeds. Around 1498, Leonardo worked on the ceiling of the Sala delle Asse, painting decorations of vegetable motifs. In the following years, however, the castle was damaged by assaults from Italian, French and German troops; a bastion, known as tenaglia, was added, perhaps designed by Cesare Cesariano. In 2025, evidence of tunnels sketched by da Vinci were identified below the structure.

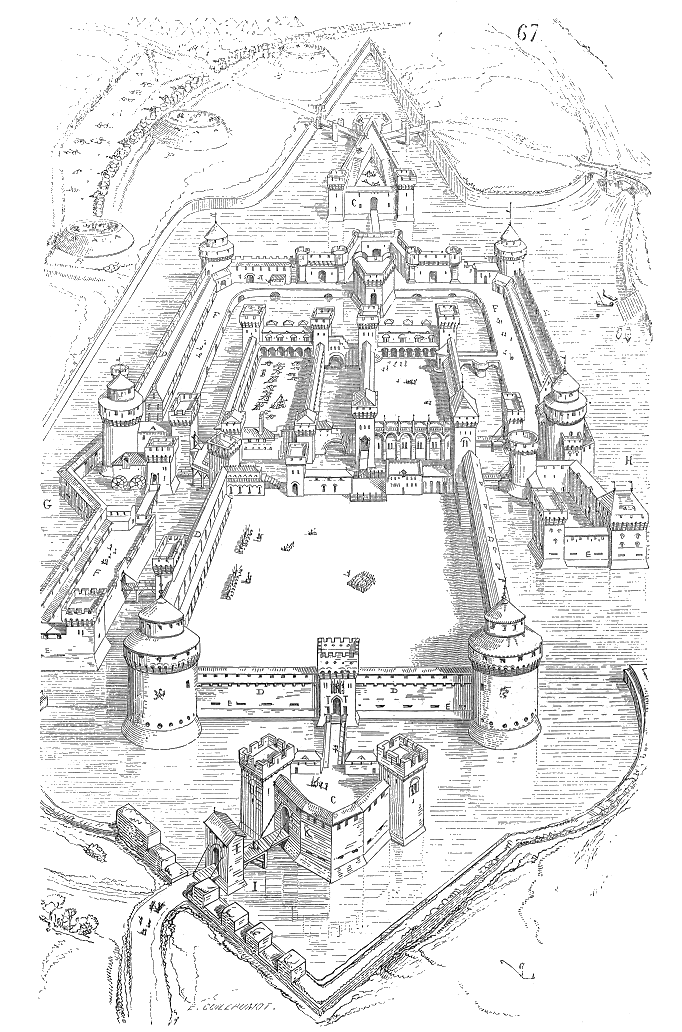
The castle in the 16th century

After the French victory in the Battle of Marignano in 1515, the defeated Maximilian Sforza, his Swiss mercenaries, as well as the cardinal-bishop of Sion retreated into the castle. However, King Francis I of France followed them into Milan, before his sappers placed mines under the castle's foundations, whereupon the defenders capitulated. In 1521, in a period in which it was used as a weapons depot, the Torre del Filarete exploded. When Francesco II Sforza returned briefly to power in Milan, he had the fortress restored and enlarged, in addition to a part of it adapted as a residence for his wife, Christina of Denmark.

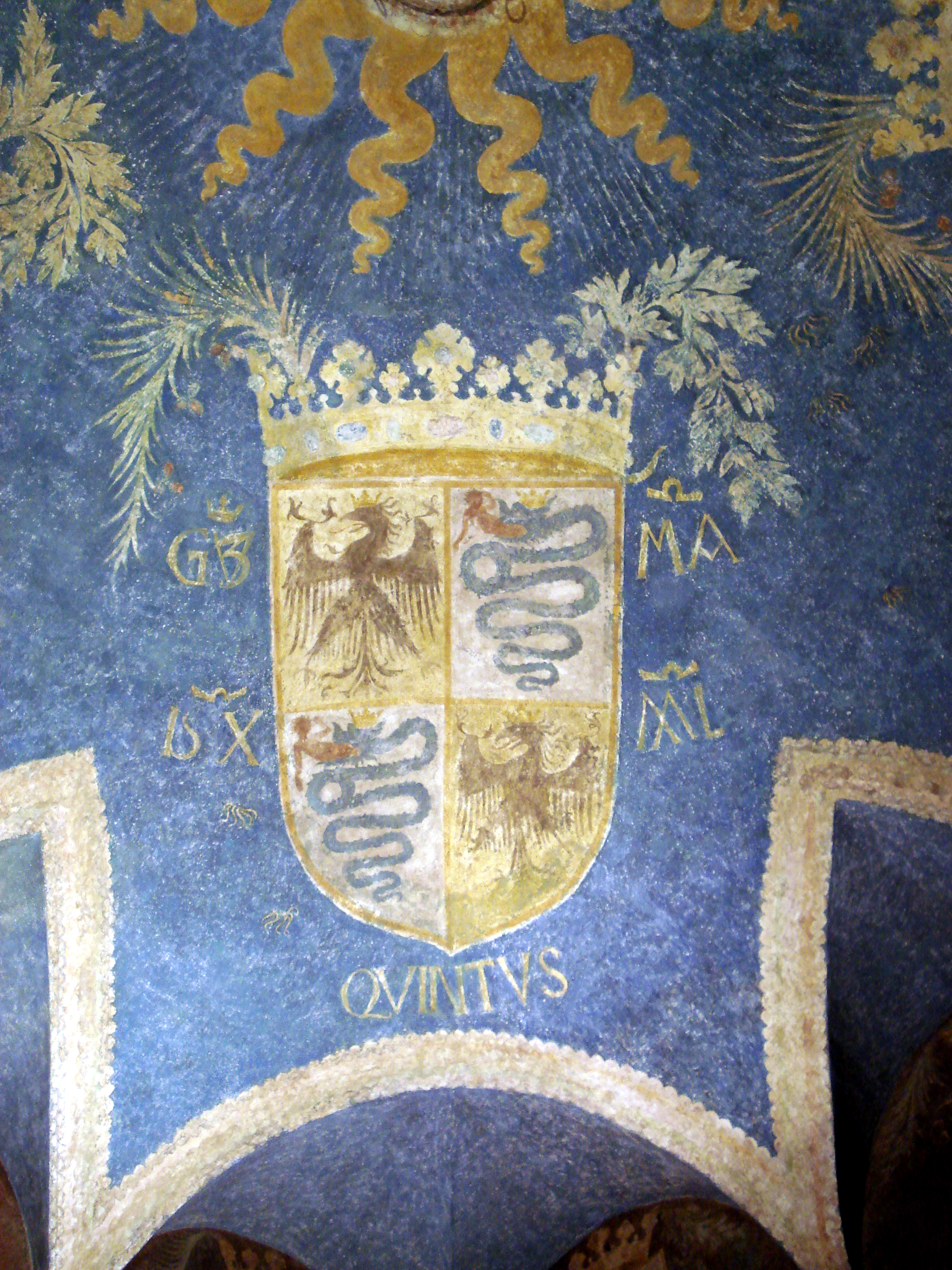
Coat of arms of Galeazzo Maria Sforza, painted on an interior ceiling

Under the Spanish domination which followed, the castle became a citadel, as the governor's seat was moved to the Ducal Palace (1535). Its garrison varied from 1,000 to 3,000 men, led by a Spanish castellan. In 1550 works began to adapt the castle to modern fortification style, as a hexagonal (originally pentagonal) star fort, following the addition of 12 bastions. The external fortifications reached 3 km in length and covered an area of 25.9 hectares. The castle also remained in use as a fort after the Spaniards were replaced by the Austrians in Lombardy.

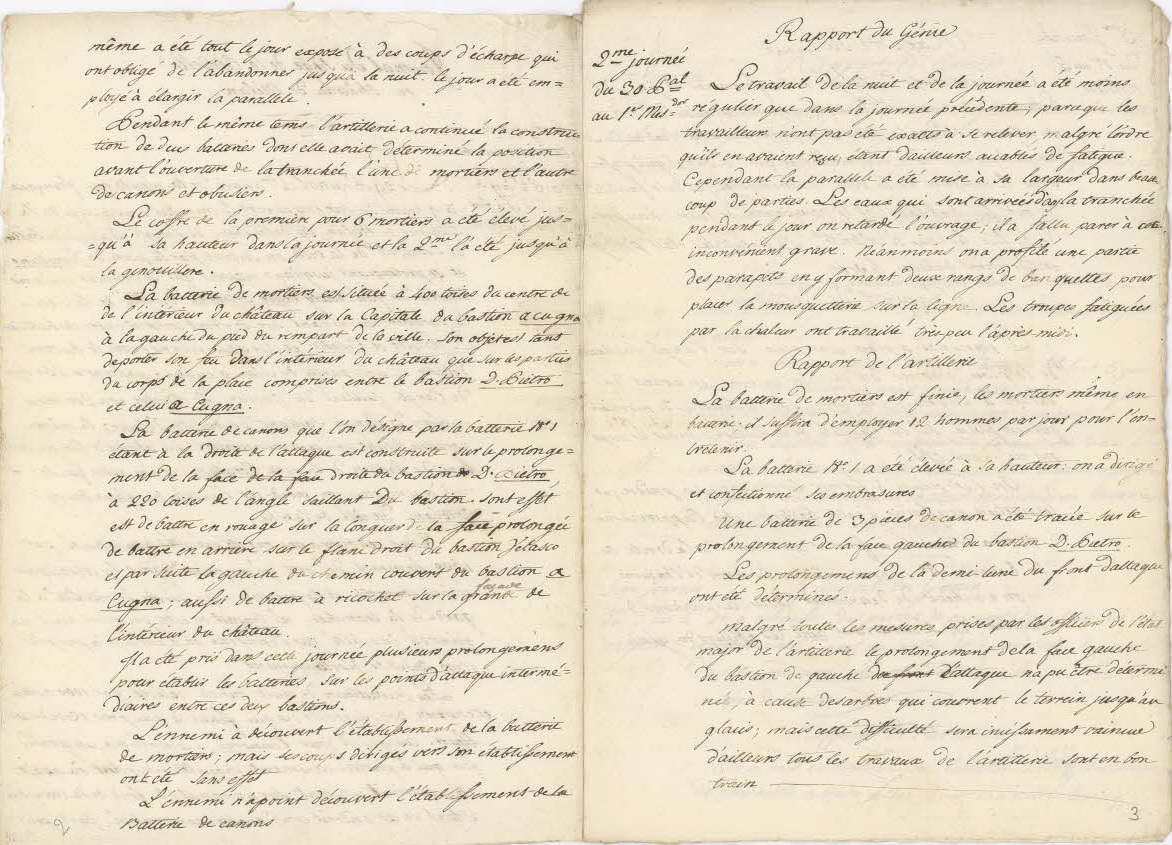
Journal of Jean-Claude Locquin describing the trenches made around the castle during Napoleonic rule. Archives nationales de France.

Most of the outer fortifications were demolished during the period of Napoleonic rule in Milan under the Cisalpine Republic. The semi-circular Piazza Castello was constructed around the city side of the castle, surrounded by a radial street layout of new urban blocks bounded by the Foro Buonaparte. The area on the "country" side of the castle was laid out as a 700-by-700-metre (2,300 by 2,300 ft) square parade ground known as Piazza d'Armi.

After the unification of Italy in the 19th century, the castle was transferred from military use to the city of Milan. Parco Sempione, one of the largest parks in the city, was created on the former parade grounds.

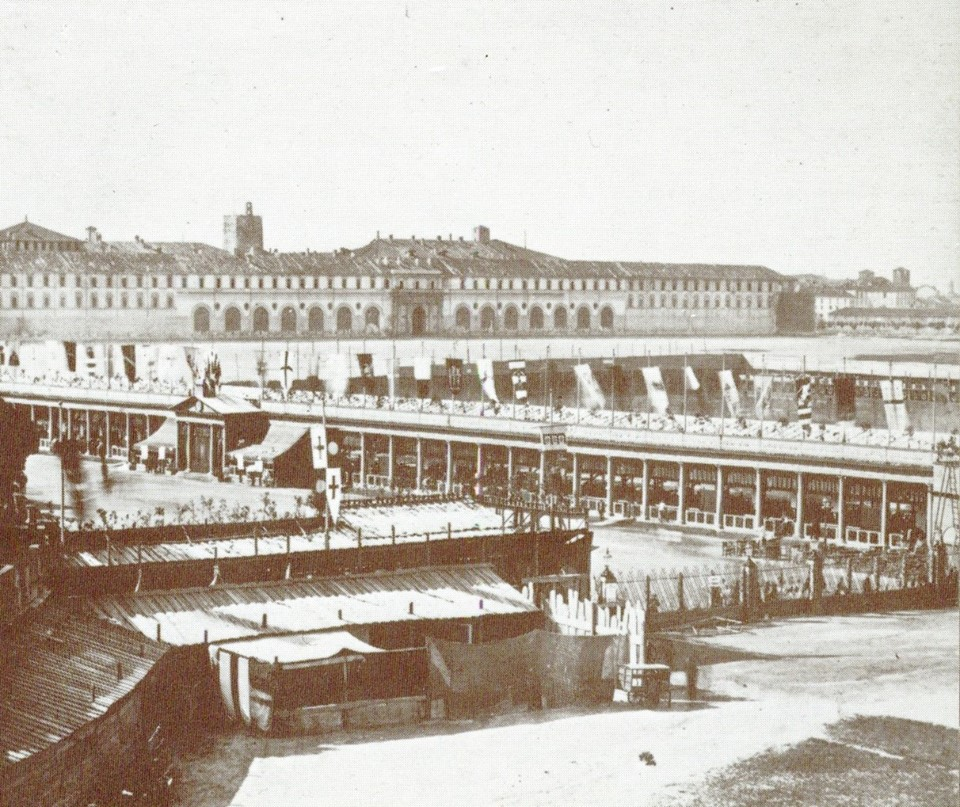
The Castle in 1860

The government of Milan undertook restoration works, directed by Luca Beltrami. The Via Dante was cut through the medieval street layout in the 1880s to provide a direct promenade between the castle and the Duomo on an axis with the main gate. Between 1900 and 1905 the Torre del Filarete was rebuilt, based on 16th-century drawings, as a monument to King Umberto I.

Allied bombardment of Milan in 1943 during World War II severely damaged the castle. The post-war reconstruction of the building for museum purposes was undertaken by the BBPR architectural partnership.

== Description ==
The castle has a quadrangular plan, on a site across the city's walls. The wall which once faced the countryside north of Milan has square towers and an ogival gate. This was once accessed through a drawbridge. The northern tower is known as the Torre della Corte, and its counterpart to the west is the Torre del Tesoro; both received wide windows during the Sforza age.

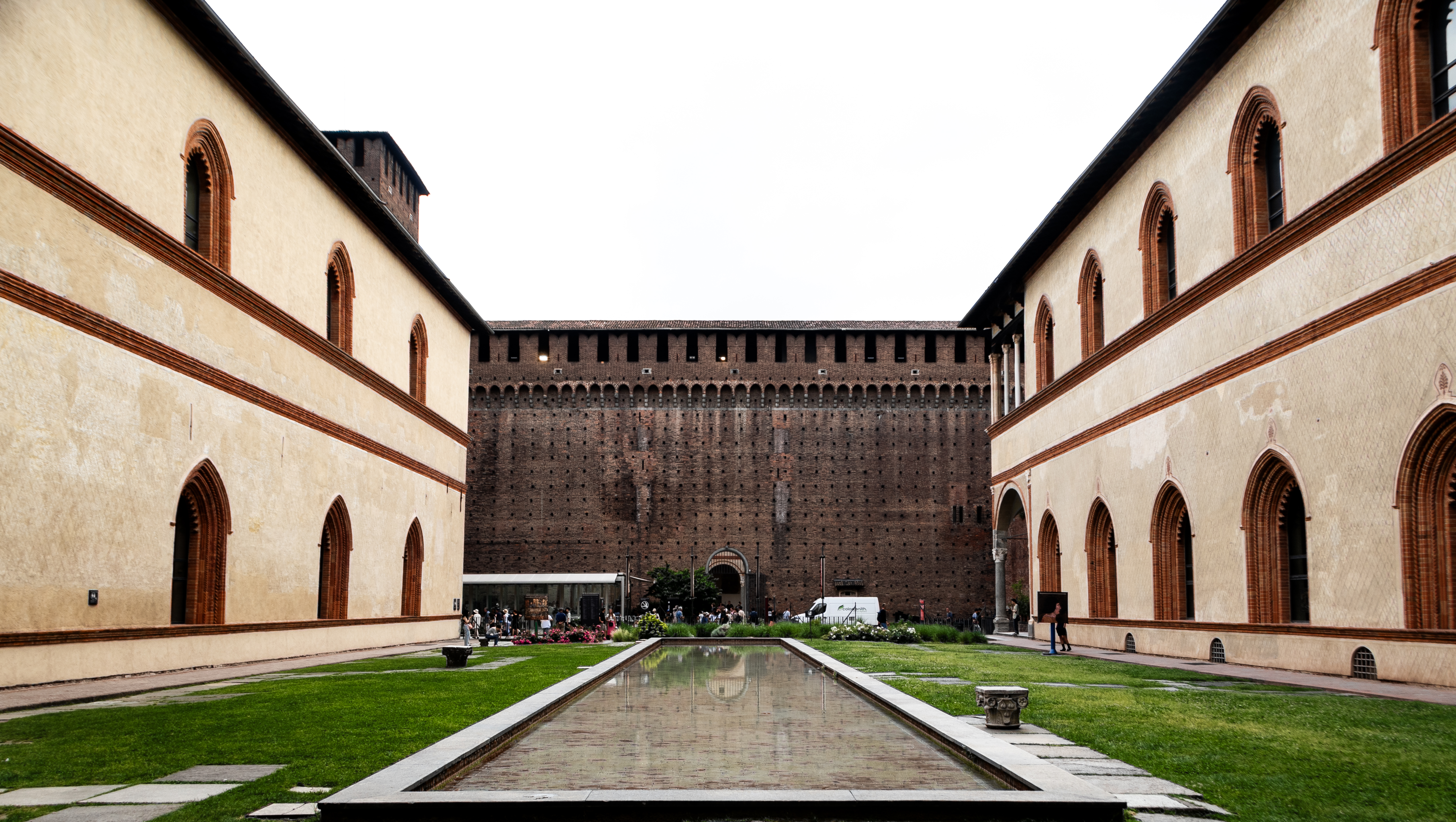
Corte Ducale, 2025

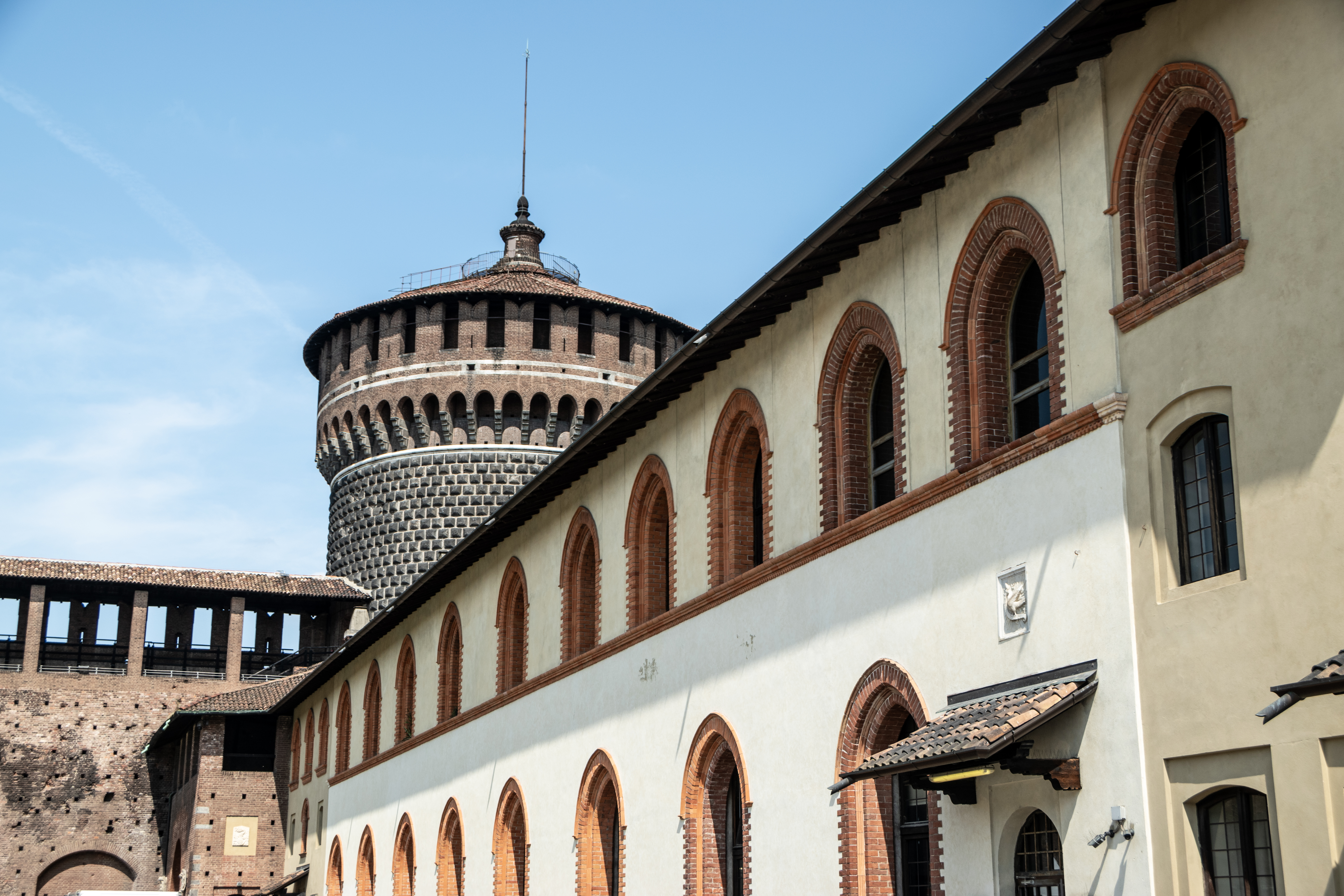
Torrione di Santo Spirito and adjacent walls

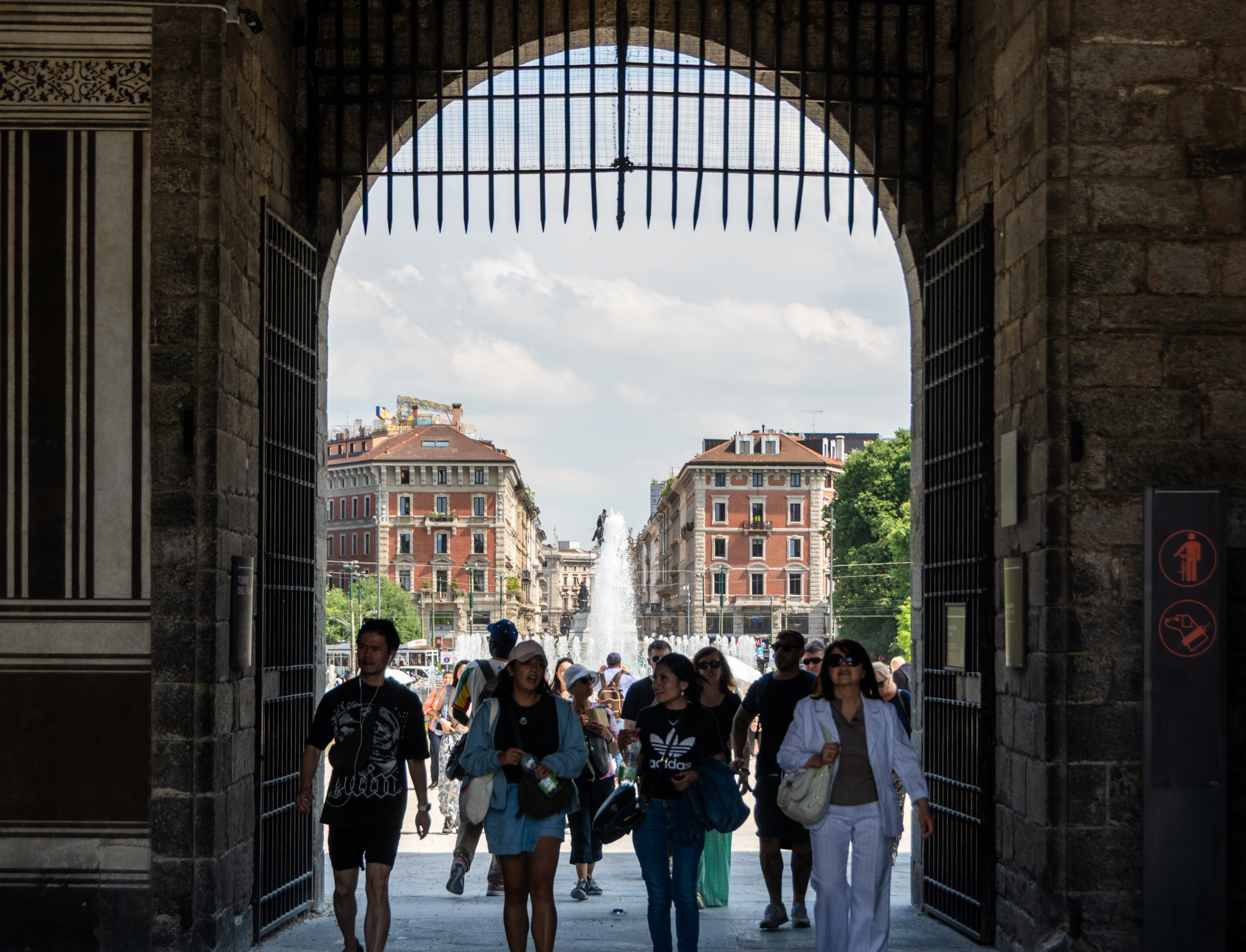
Main gate

The corner defended by the Torre Ducale is characterized by a loggia bridge, attributed to Bramante, and commissioned by Ludovico Sforza in the late 15th century to connect the Corte Ducale (the court in the area used as a ducal residence) and the Cortile della Ghirlanda. This ghirlanda refers to a wall, protected by a ditch filled with water, built under Francesco Sforza, of which few traces remain today, including the Porta del Soccorso. Remains of two later ravelins can be seen in correspondence of the point in which the castle was joined by the city walls (near the Porta Comasina gate) and the Porta del Carmine. The Porta della Ghirlanda gate was entered through a ravelin (now lost) and had two entrances accessed through runways, which led to an underground passage which continued along the walls.

The external side which once faced the walled city has two round towers, commissioned by Francesco Sforza to replace the former square ones, which had become less suitable to defend against fire weapons. The central tower, called the Torre del Filarete, is a modern reconstruction. The round towers lost their upper parts under the Austrians, who needed open space for their artillery; the towers' present-day upper sections are modern reconstructions. The Torre del Filarete and the Porta del Santo Spirito, located further to the south, are both preceded by a ravelin.

The main gate leads to a large court from which several internal features can be seen. These include the Tower of Bona of Savoy (1476) and the Rocchetta, a sort of internal defensive ridotto with a gate of its own. At the right of the Porta del Carmine are the remains of two 15th-century courts. The Rocchetta, whose access gate from the main court (a modern addition) features the Sforza coat of arms, has an internal court with, on three sides, a portico with 15th-century arcades. The Corte Ducale is the wing of the castle originally used as a ducal residence; it features a court with two loggias, a smaller one on the left and a larger one at its end, called Loggiato dell'Elefante due to the presence of a fresco of an elephant.

== Civic museums ==
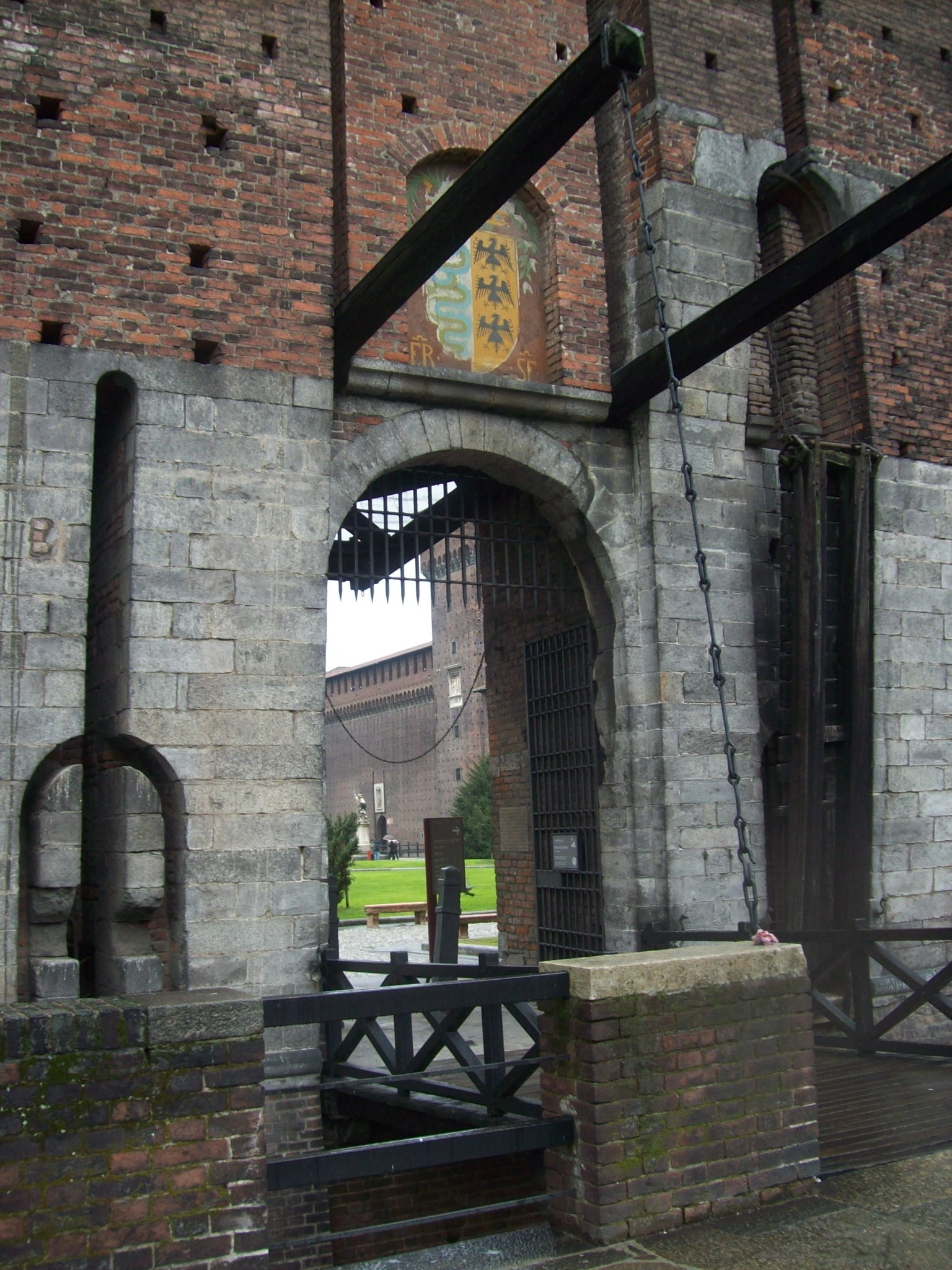
One of the four castle entrances

The Sforza Castle complex includes the following museums:

- The Pinacoteca del Castello Sforzesco with an art collection which includes Andrea Mantegna's Trivulzio Madonna and masterpieces by Canaletto, Tiepolo, Vincenzo Foppa, Titian and Tintoretto
- The Museum of Ancient Art which includes the armoury, the tapestry room and some funerary monuments
- The Museum of Musical Instruments
- The Egyptian Museum
- The Prehistoric collections of the Archaeological Museum of Milan
- Applied Arts Collection
- The Antique Furniture & Wooden Sculpture Museum
- The Achille Bertarelli Print Collection. In the same building that formerly housed Scuola Superiore d'Arte Applicata all'Industria.
- The Museum of the Rondanini Pietà, which includes Michelangelo's last sculpture (the Rondanini Pietà)

In 2012, new paintings attributed to Michelangelo Merisi da Caravaggio were discovered at the castle.

== Biblioteca Trivulziana ==
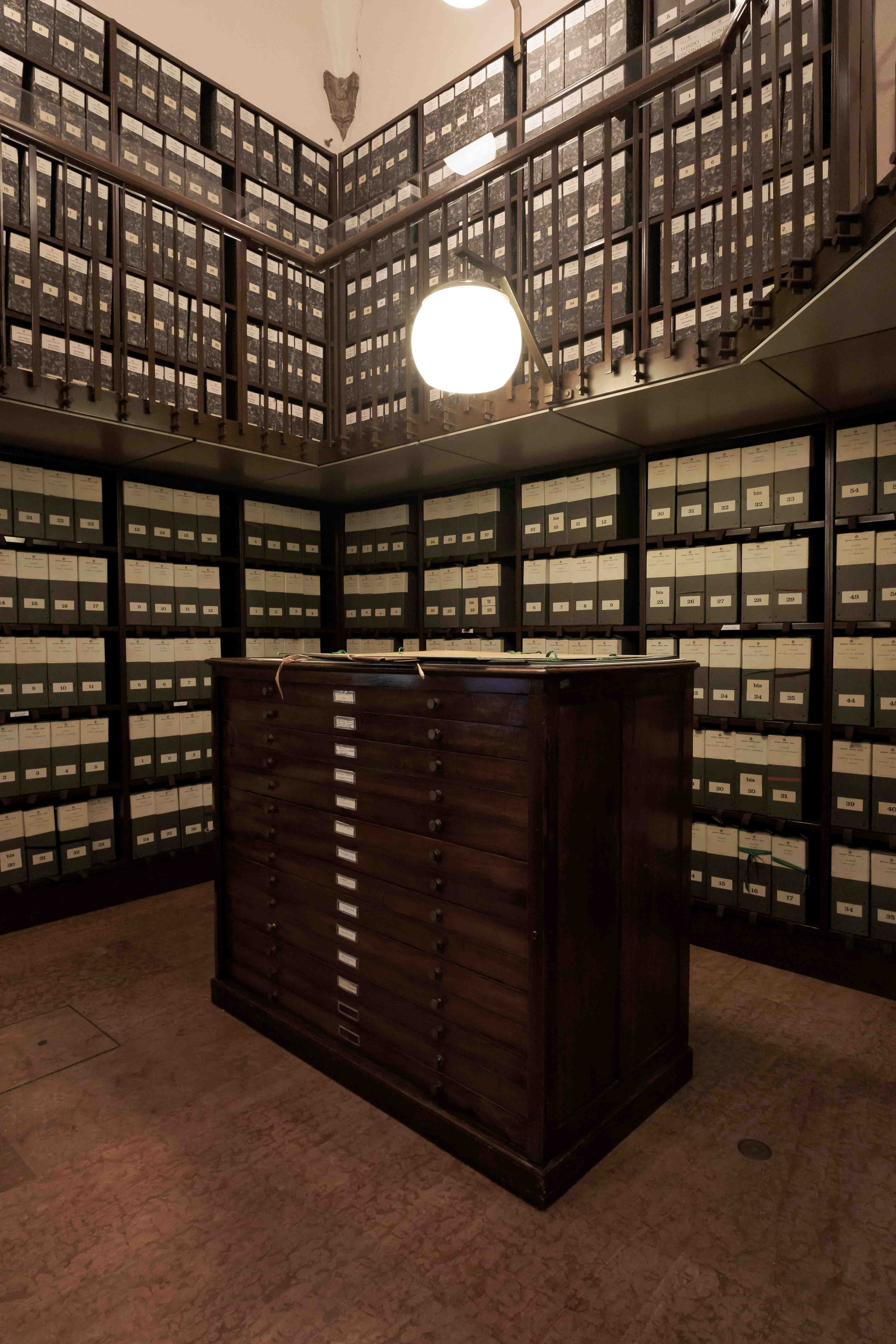
Milano - Biblioteca Trivulziana

The Biblioteca Trivulziana is a library of the Municipality of Milan located inside the Sforza Castle, annexed to the Civic Historical Archive. The Biblioteca Trivulziana has a collection of around 180,000 books, including 1,300 manuscripts and 1,300 incunabula. Notable items in the collection include an illuminated codex of Dante's Divine Comedy from 1337 and a rare 14th-century text of De vulgari eloquentia. The library's most famous possession is the Codex Trivulzianus, a notebook filled with Leonardo da Vinci's writings, sketches and studies. The Civic Historical Archive possesses an extensive civic documentation for the city of Milan and the Duchy dating from 1385 onwards.

== Burials ==
- Bona of Savoy

== See also ==
- House of Sforza
- Sala delle Asse
- Late medieval domes

== Bibliography ==
- Costa, Patrizia. “The Sala Delle Asse in the Sforza Castle in Milan.” ProQuest Dissertations & Theses, 2006.
- Michela Palazzo; Francesca Tasso, eds. (2017). The Sala delle Asse of the Sforza Castle. Leonardo da Vinci. Diagnostic Testing and Restoration of the Monochrome. Cinisello Balsamo: Silvana. ISBN 978-88-366-3677-8.
- Padovan, Gianluca (2019). Castrum Portae Jovis Mediolani: il Castello Visconteo-Sforzesco di Milano dai disegni di Leonardo da Vinci all’archeologica del sottosuolo. Oxford: BAR Publishing. doi:10.30861/9781407356129.
- Proietti, N, D Capitani, V Di Tullio, R Olmi, S Priori, C Riminesi, A Sansonetti, et al. “MOdihMA at Sforza Castle in Milano: Innovative Techniques for Moisture Detection in Historical Masonry.” In Built Heritage: Monitoring Conservation Management, 187–97. Switzerland: Springer International Publishing AG, 2015. https://doi.org/10.1007/978-3-319-08533-3_16.
