= Garstang (surname) =

Garstang is a surname. Notable people with the surname include:

- Jim Garstang, pianist for the Cathedral Quartet from 1972 through 1973
- John Garstang 1876–1956, British archaeologist of the ancient Near East
- John Garstang (footballer) (1876–1957), English footballer
- Marie Garstang 1880-1949, archaeologist, wife of John Garstang
- Timi Garstang, American-born Marshallese track athlete
- Walter Garstang 1868–1949, Professor of Zoology at the University of Leeds, one of the first to study the functional biology of marine invertebrate larvae
