= Historiography of Romanisation =

Branch of history that learns about the ancient Roman times

The historiography of Romanisation is the study of the methods, sources, techniques, and concepts used by historians when examining the process of Romanisation. The Romanisation process affected different regions differently, meaning that there is no singular definition for the concept, however it is generally defined as the spread of Roman civilisation and culture throughout Italy and the provinces as an indication of a historical process, such as acculturation, integration and assimilation. Generally, the Romanisation process affected language, economics, cultural structures (art, religion, entertainment, recreation), family norms and material culture. Rome introduced its culture mainly through conquest, colonisation, trade, and the resettlement of retired soldiers.

Romanisation, as a term, was first coined in 1885 by Theodore Mommsen who held the imperial view that Roman culture was superior to provincial ones. The main viewpoints can be categorised into two groups. The traditionalist perspective sees Romanisation as representing the cultural transformation with evident Roman civilisation, cultural and political. The Post-processualists and structuralists define Romanisation as a concept born from Mommsen's school of thought, and is a construct of this school to understand the process.

The study of historiography is a relatively new phenomenon and is defined as study of how history is constructed, meaning "When you study 'historiography' you do not study the events of the past directly, but the changing interpretations of those events in the works of individual historians."

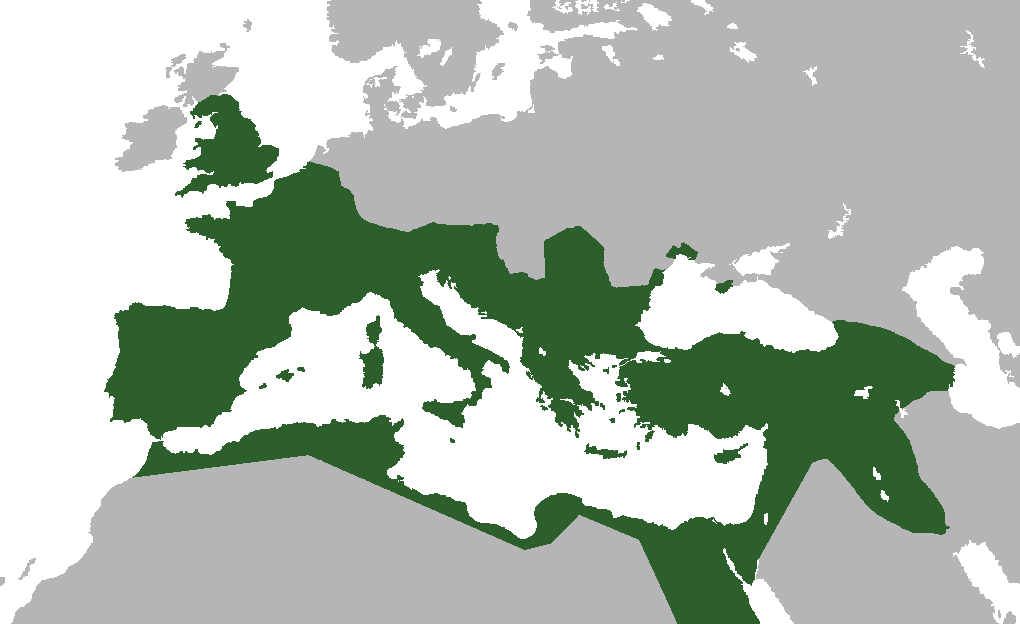
The expanse of the Roman Empire in 117 AD.

The historiography of Romanisation involves many contentions and varied opinions as time goes on and the influencing context, views and values of historians evolves. The study of the historiography of Romanisation is important as it reveals cultural development and change that can be applied to other historical events and has major impacts on other disciplines, such as archaeology, as it shapes how events and findings are interpreted. One of the current major contentions to the more traditional view of Romanisation as a process where native cultures are replaced with the more superior Roman culture is its association with imperialism and colonialism due to the present post-colonial, post-modern views of many modern historians.

== Antiquity perspectives ==
In regards to Britain ancient figures saw these unknown lands as being filled with barbarians who possessed no culture or civilisation. Many in antiquity, such as Caesar, Pliny the Elder, Propertius, Ovid and Martial, use the Britons dying their bodies with woad (to produce blue and green) as an indication of their otherness. Cassius Dio describes the tribes from northern Britain as being "fond of plundering", "naked and unshod", and "possess[ing] their women in common" It is argued that the image of Britain presented was a propaganda invention to promote imperial power and prestige. Strabo viewed that Britain was "virtually Roman property", meaning there was no need for a conquest. Their perspectives of Gaul and Germania were much the same.

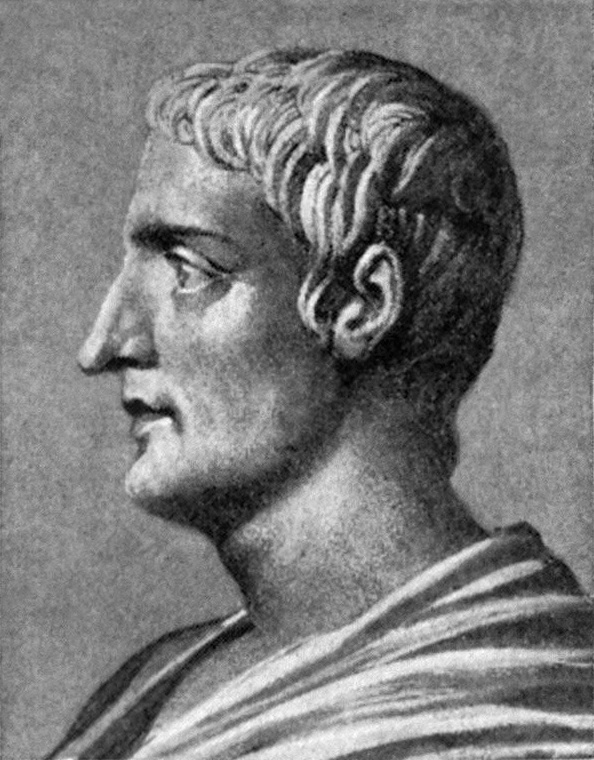
Gaius Cornelius Tacitus

=== Tacitus ===
The Roman orator and historian Tacitus (56 – 120 AD) lived in the Roman Empire during the 1st century CE. His major works Germania, Agricola, Histories, and the Annals all reveal his imperial perspective of the Romanisation process. In them he describes how Roman culture was deliberately promoted as "a tool of imperialism". in his Agricola, a biography of his father-in-law's and his command in Britain, stating that the introduction of Latin, baths, "sumptuous banquets", and togas was "in their ignorance they called culture, when in fact it was just one facet of their enslavement" Tacitus's opinion on the superiority of Romans can be seen in his use of language in his construction of history, such as "primitive", to describe provincial peoples. However, he also has passages that sustain the idea of the noble savage.

Statue of Ovid in Constanta (formally Tomis)

=== Ovid ===
Ovid, the Roman poet from the period of Augustus's reign presented a Rome-centred, imperial perspective in this writing, stemming from his context within the Roman Empire. His poems Tristia ("Sorrows") and Epistulae ex Ponto ("Letters from the Black Sea") written during his exile to a remote city called Tomis on the Black Sea has been interpreted by historians, such as Thomas Habinek, to display Rome as the "necessary centre of the empire", as the root of artistic and political authority and Tomis as an uncivilised, mostly barbarian and culture less city. His poem Metamorphoses is a display of the adoption of Greek culture being adopted and adapted so that it is Romanised by Romans.

== 18th century perspectives ==
=== Edward Gibbon ===
Edward Gibbon (1737–1794), an upper class British historian, writer and member of Parliament during the Imperial British Empire, wrote an imperial, Rome centred history of Rome and the Romanisation process. His most notable work is The History of the Decline and Fall of the Roman Empire.

== 19th century perspectives ==
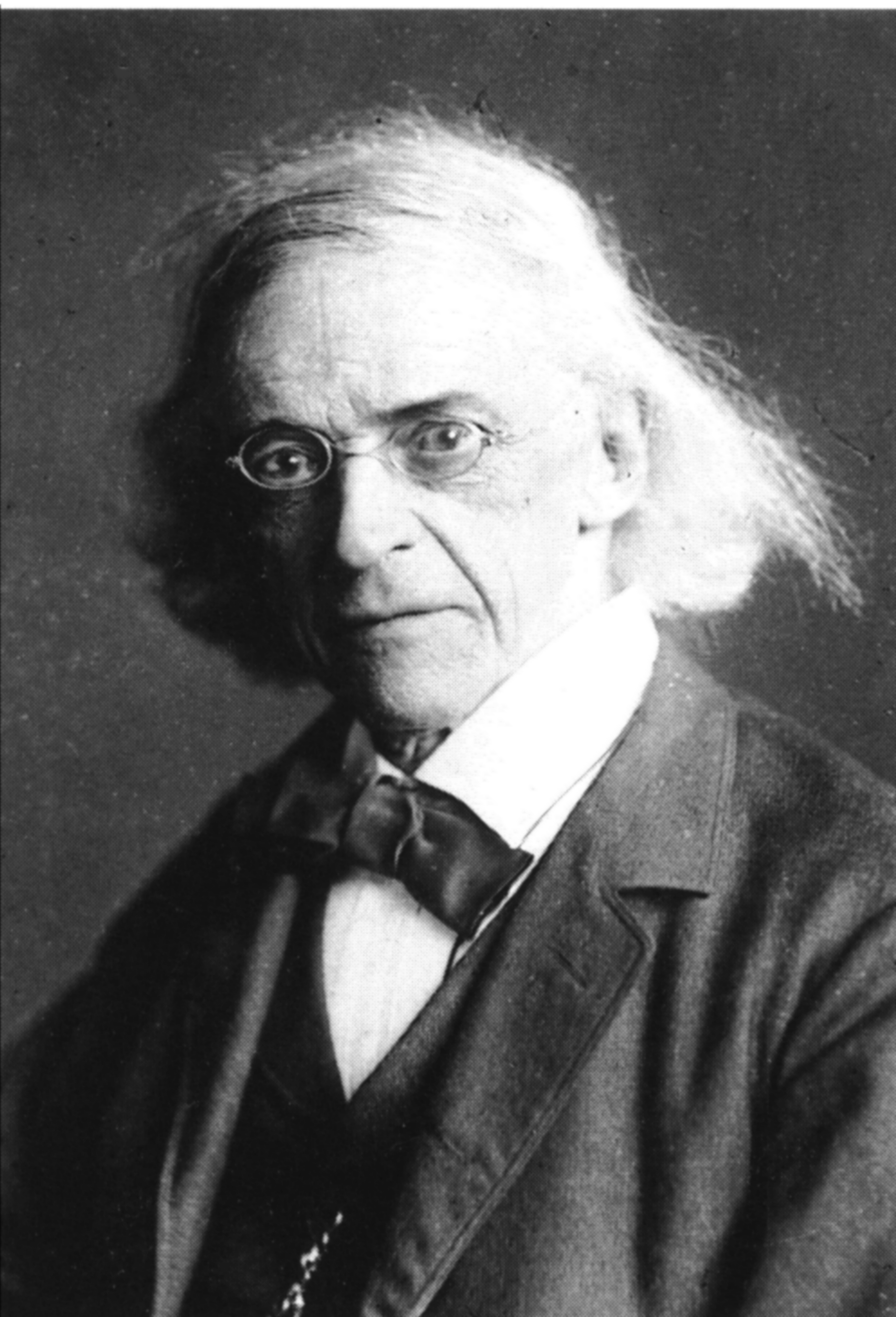
Theodor Mommsen

During the 19th century the dominant perspective was focused around a military theme, with most historians stressing the evidence of the Romans as "military settlers", with few natives adopting their identity and culture.

=== Theodor Mommsen ===
Credited with coining the term 'Romanisation' in 1885, the German historian, classicist and archaeologist Theodor Mommsen (1817–1903) was influenced by his imperial perspective and held the view that Roman culture was superior to native cultures. He did not define the term but his view of the spreading for Roman power falls in-line with the later definition by his pupil, Francis Haverfield. Mommsen argued that the introduction of Roman culture was a social advancement for native populations. His review of epigraphic evidence aided in modifying earlier understanding of Roman social change into something more dynamic and accurate. His approach had a major influence on the archaeology of Roman-Britain during the twentieth century.

== 20th century perspectives ==
=== Francis Haverfield ===
Many consider Francis Haverfield (1860–1919) the 'father of Romano-British studies' and as one of the first to study the process of Romanisation his perspective remained widely accepted for almost a century. He was the first to define the term 'Romanisation' with influence from Mommsen. Heavily influenced by Mommsen, who was his academic advisor, he held the view that the Roman provinces were “given a civilization” by the Romans, a very colonial perspective, and states that the Roman empire's "long and peaceable administration of dominions" gave its provinces "its gifts of civilisation, citizenship, and language." He believed that out of the "stable and coherent order" the Roman empire provided, modern Europe emerged. He perceived Roman Britain to be only a province in a global empire and should therefore be studied in its relation to Rome, stating that "It is no use to know about Roman Britain in particular, unless you also know about the Roman empire."

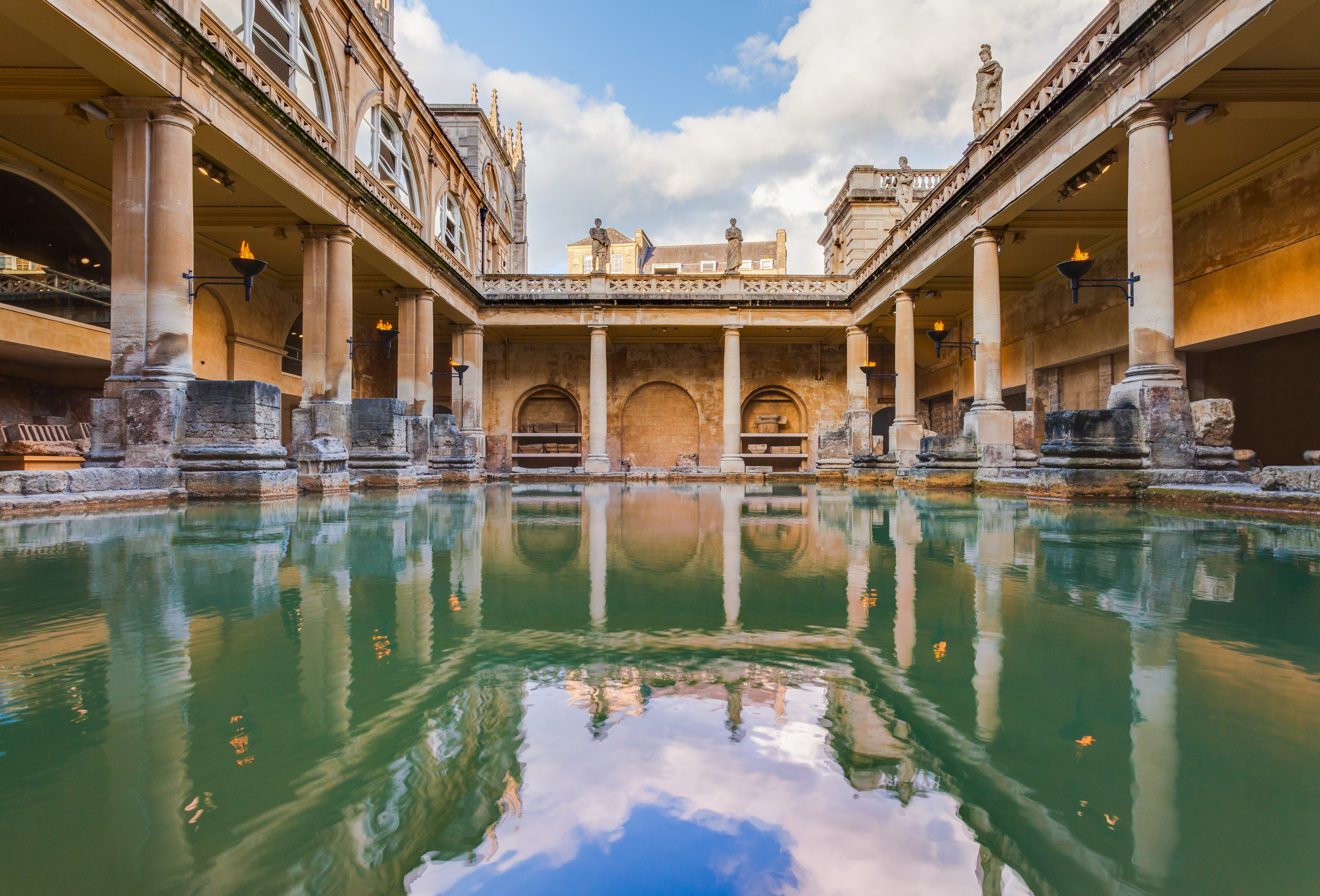
Roman Baths in Bath, England. An example of Romanisation in Britain.

He supported the traditional perspective of Romanisation where it falls under the acculturation theory in order to express the process of native cultures being replaced by the Roman culture with complete acculturation and homogenisation of cultures, with a linear transfer of values, opinions and practices. His major focus on the elite in provincial societies meant that the larger amount of society was neglected and largely unincluded in his studies. His focus on the elite stems from his use of the classics and ancient historians, such as Tacitus, who held imperial perspectives. Haverfield argued that Romanisation was a top-down process, meaning that once the elite of provincial societies had been romanised then those in the lower classes would also adopt Roman culture, dismissing the common assumption that they held their native culture at a dormant level.

Additionally, he argues that Rome itself lost their cultural distinction through the Romanisation process as they too absorbed some aspects of provincial cultures. His main work on Romanisation is The Romanization of Roman Britain (1905).

=== R.G. Collingwood ===
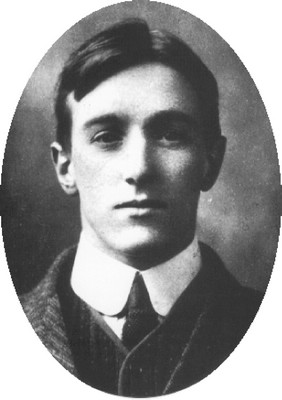
R.G. Collingwood

The English philosopher, historian, archaeologist, and student of Haverfield, R.G. Collingwood (1889–1943) held the view that a 'fusion' of cultures was produced during the process of Romanisation, rather than dominance. Using the example of Roman Britain, he displays that the Roman culture that was introduced was not purely Roman, and instead a blend of Roman and Celtic elements to make a hybrid culture that was uniquely Romano-British. Collingwood's views have been criticised as many believe he did not understand the full strength of Rome's presence in the provinces.

His works include Roman Britain (1923), The Archaeology of Roman Britain (1930), and Roman Britain and English Settlements (1936).

=== A.N. Sherwin-White ===
A.N. Sherwin-White (1911–1993), a British historian, suggests that the Romanisation process was led by the natives themselves. This view has been criticised due to the unlikeliness that native groups would willingly abandon their culture to adopt the Roman culture.

== 21st century perspectives ==
=== Richard Hingley ===
Richard Hingley suggests that the term ‘globalization' should be used as a replacement due to its more neutral connotations. Hingley believes that classical historians articulated a "deeply imperial comprehension of the relationship between colonizers and the colonized" in their writings and archaeological research. He has not only conducted studies into Romano-Britain but also into the impact of imperial Rome in a post-Roman context, especially since the Renaissance.

His main works in regards to Romanisation are his journal article Not so Romanized? Tradition, reinvention or discovery in the study of Roman Britain (2008), and Globalising Roman culture: unity, diversity and empire (2005).

=== Martin Millett ===
The British archaeologist and historian Martin Millett (1955 – ) argues that the Romanisation process was led by the provincial elite in a "native-led emulation" which then spread down to all levels of society. His view is that the natives were willing participants in the process as an act of assimilation.

Millett's main works involving Romanisation are The Romanisation of Britain: an essay in archaeological interpretation (1990), Roman Britain (1995), Integration in the Early Roman West: the role of culture and ideology (1995), and Britons and Romans: advancing an archaeological agenda (2001).

=== Greg Woolf ===
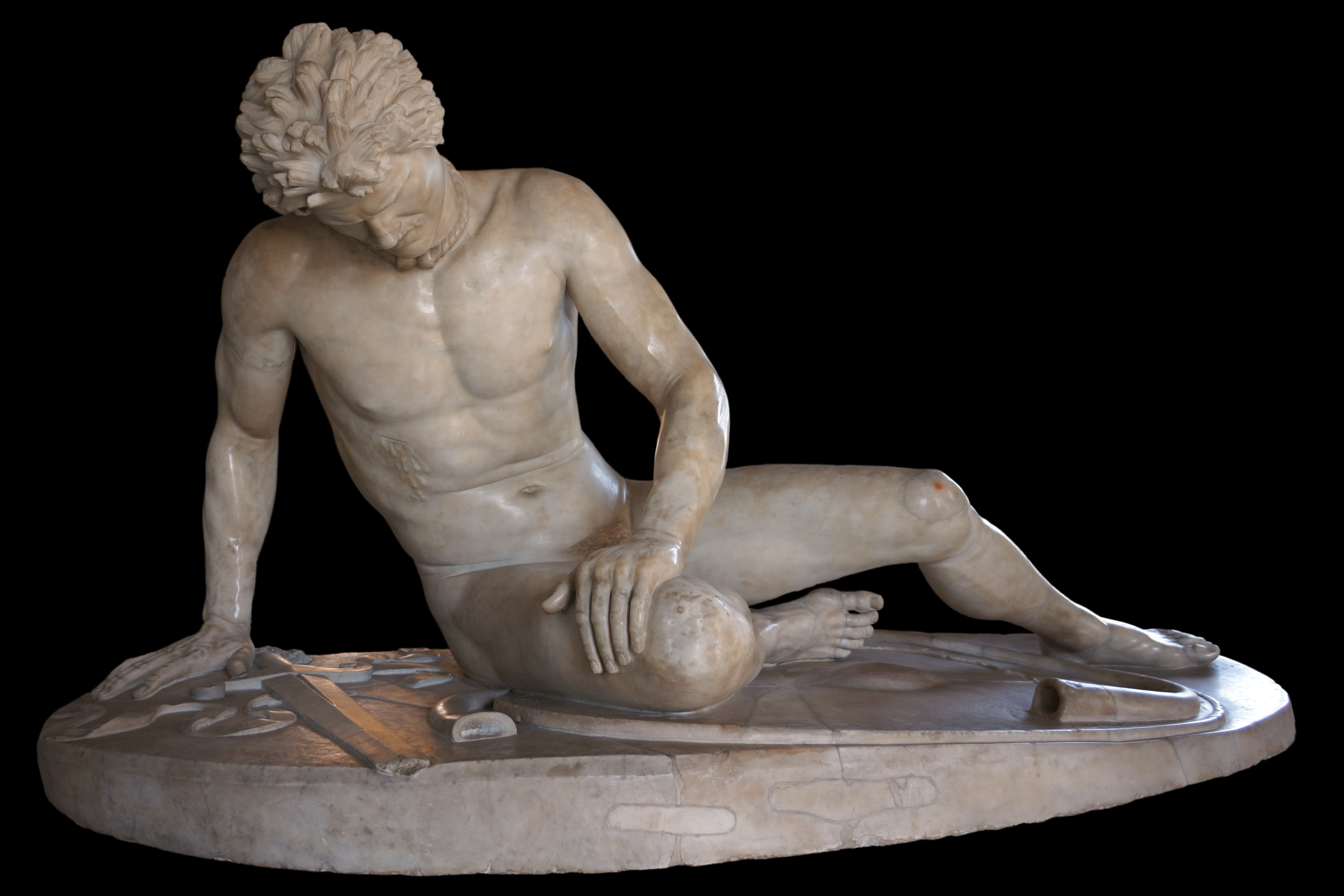
The Dying Gaul statue from the Capitoline Museums

With a focus on provincial Gaul, the British modern revisionist historian and archaeologist Greg Woolf believes that the changes inflicted by the Romanisation process affected different regions and communities differently, meaning that there cannot be a unified definition of the effects of Romanisation. His “Beyond Romans and Natives” explores the changes in both Gallic and Roman cultures, noting at that Roman culture was not uniform throughout its empire due to the effect of native cultures. Woolf argues that both imperial approaches and new theories, such as the acculturation theory, “share the same fundamental assumption” in that they assume that “a conflict between peoples entails a conflict between cultures”.

His major works that involve Romanisation are his article "Becoming Roman, staying Greek: Culture, identity and the civilising process in the Roman East" (1994), Becoming Roman: the origins of provincial civilisation in Gaul (1998), and Tales of the barbarians: ethnography and empire in the Roman West (2011).

=== Jane Webster ===
The historical archaeologist Jane Webster believes that Romanisation "is simply acculturation" and that the term 'Romanisation' is an inaccurate label, suggesting 'creolization' is a more appropriate and accurate term to describe the process. She uses examples from modern history, such as African-American and Africa-Caribbean societies, to mirror to the Romanisation process, arguing that a creole perspective allows for a 'bottom-up' perspective of the "negotiation of post-conquest identities", rather than from the traditional perspective of the elite. She views the process as a "multicultural adjustment". She hold a very post-colonial, post-imperial perspective.

Webster's main works regarding Romanisation are her articles "Creolisation" (2016), "Rome and the 'Barbarians'" (2007), "A negotiated syncretism: readings on the development of Romano-Celtic religion" (1997), "Necessary comparisons: a post-colonial approach to religious syncretism in the Roman provinces" (1997) and her books Roman imperialism and provincial art (2003, with Sarah Scott) and Roman imperialism: post-colonial perspectives (1996).

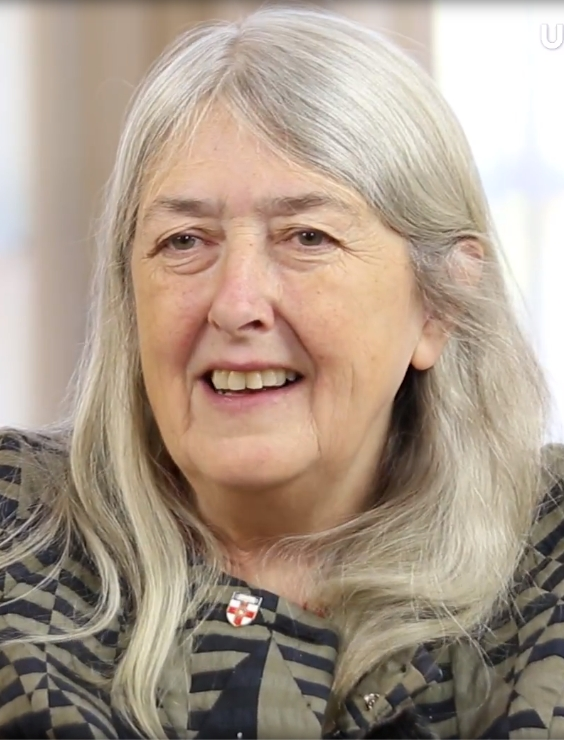
Mary Beard

=== Mary Beard ===
Mary Beard (1955–) is a classicist who uses archaeology & material evidence heavily in her construction of Romanisation. She points out that the local population was significantly contributing to their own development as a Roman province, and not as a result of the power and occupation of Rome. The material evidence that Beard uses to support her argument, such as pottery, foods, clothing and other everyday items, that it was the native population that made their own choice to emulate the Romans.

Beard's main works contributing to her view of the Romanisation process are SPQR: A History of Ancient Rome (2015) and Religions of Rome (1998).
