= Department of Archaeology, Classics and Egyptology, University of Liverpool =

Organizational unit at the University of Liverpool

Coordinates: 53.4023°N 2.9645°W

Department of Archaeology, Classics and Egyptology
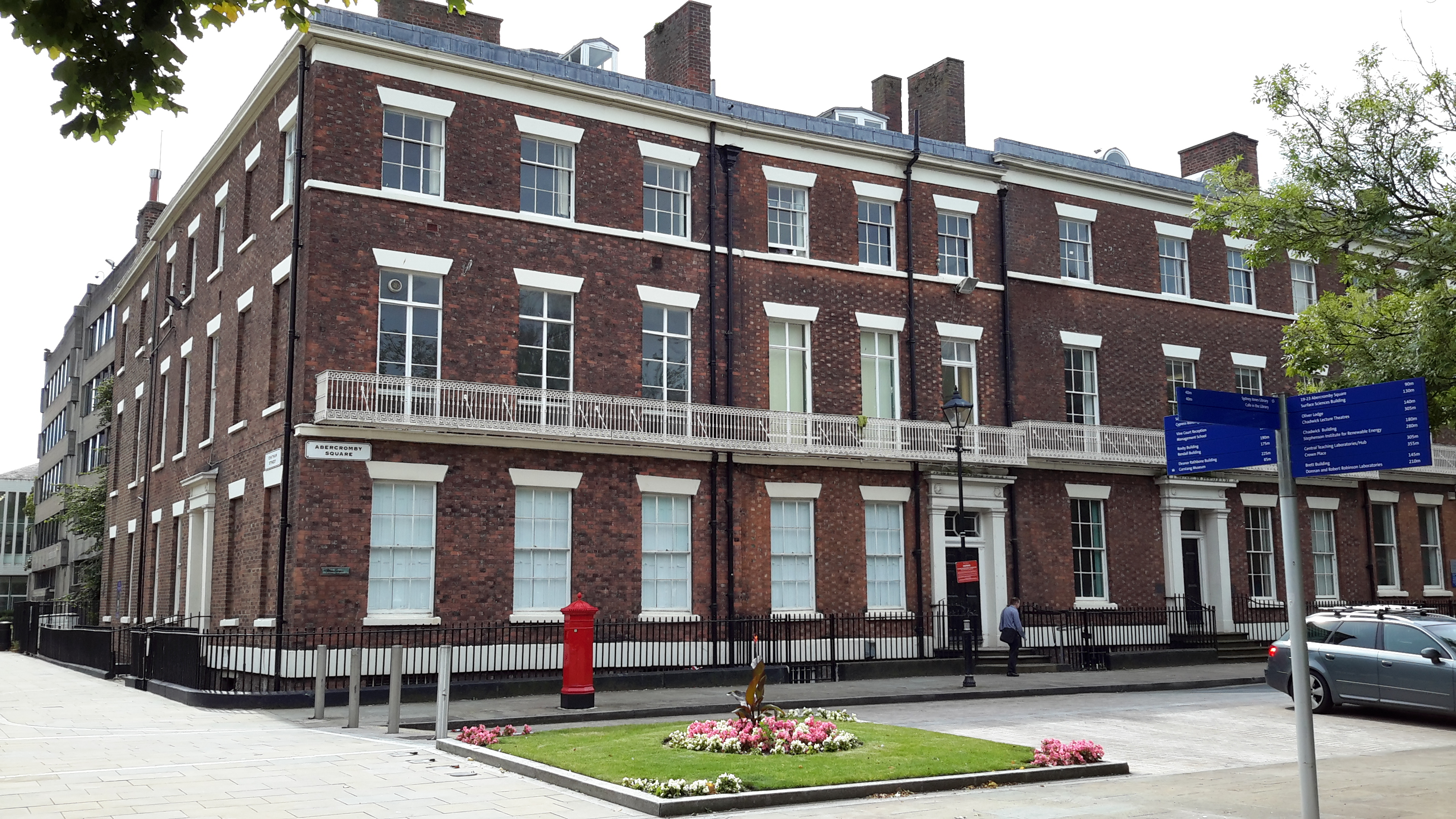
- Type: Public university
- Established: 1904
- Affiliations: University of Liverpool
- Location: Liverpool, L69 7WZ, UK
- Campus: Liverpool City Centre
- Website: Official website

The Department of Archaeology, Classics and Egyptology (also known as ACE) has 40 members of staff and over 300 undergraduate and postgraduate students.

== History ==
In 1904 John Garstang established the Institute of Archaeology, the first centre for the academic study of the methods and practice of Archaeology alongside Egyptology and Classical Archaeology in the UK. Robert Carr Bosanquet taught at the University of Liverpool from 1906 to 1920 as the first holder of the Chair of Classical Archaeology, John Percival Postgate served as Professor of Latin at the University from 1909 to 1920, and Percy Newberry was the first Brunner Professor of Egyptology from 1906 to 1919.

At present, members of the Department of Archaeology, Classics and Egyptology engage in interdisciplinary research in the fields of Old World prehistory (particularly of Southwest Asia, Mediterranean Europe and Africa), human evolution and palaeoanthropology, bioarchaeology, environmental archaeology, archaeomaterials, Egyptology, the archaeology, languages, history and cultures of the Ancient Near East and the Mediterranean, later British prehistory, heritage management, medieval & post-medieval archaeology, and the history, literature, language, culture and post-antique receptions of Ancient Greece and Ancient Rome. Since 2010 the Department of Archaeology, Classics and Egyptology has been part of the School of Histories, Languages and Cultures, one of the four Schools in the Faculty of Humanities and Social Sciences. The School also includes the departments of History, Modern Languages & Cultures, Irish Studies and Politics.

In the 2014 Research Excellence Framework 100% of Liverpool's research in Archaeology and 94% in Classics were judged as internationally outstanding. A major focus of the departmental research, teaching and outreach activities is the Garstang Museum of Archaeology, one of the most important collections of antiquities in the UK including objects excavated in Egypt, the Aegean, Anatolia, the Levant, Sudan and Britain. In 2015 the department's science-based archaeology facilities were substantially expanded, with the establishment of the Elizabeth Slater Archaeology Research Laboratories. These facilities support research by staff and students on stable isotopes and palaeodiet, human remains, anthracology and archaeobotany, archaeozoology, archaeomaterials, lithics and ceramics, experimental archaeology, post-excavation analysis and GIS applications in archaeology.

== Facilities ==
- The Garstang Museum of Archaeology
- Stable isotope and palaeodiet laboratory
- Archaeobotany laboratory
- Lithics laboratory
- Finds processing & sample preparation laboratory
- Atomic spectroscopy & Trace element chemistry laboratory
- Liverpool Archaeology Field School
- Geographic Information Systems (GIS) and Visualisation suite
- Scanning Electron Microscopy suite
- Ancient Technologies Workshop
- Environmental Sciences laboratory
- Centre for Manx Studies

== Undergraduate and postgraduate programmes ==
The Department offers a range of undergraduate and postgraduate (taught and research) programmes.

=== Undergraduate ===
Single Honours programmes: Archaeology (BA, BSc), Archaeology of Ancient Civilisations (BA), Evolutionary Anthropology (BSc), Ancient History (BA), Classics (BA), Classical Studies (BA), Egyptology (BA). The department also offers a range of courses combining different subject areas through the Faculty of Humanities and Social Sciences Honours Select degree programme.

=== Postgraduate Taught ===
ACE Masters courses provide options for advanced training in human evolution, Old World prehistory, human palaeoecology, archaeological sciences, the archaeology, languages and cultures of the Mediterranean, the Ancient Near East and Egypt, the history, cultures and receptions of ancient Greece and Rome, and ancient Greek and Latin. Current Masters programmes: Archaeology (MA, MSc, MRes), Palaeoanthropology (MSc, MRes), Ancient History (MA), Classics (MA), Classics and Ancient History (MRes), Egyptology (MA, MRes).

=== Postgraduate Research ===
The Department of Archaeology, Classics and Egyptology hosts the largest community of Postgraduate Researchers from any other academic department in the Faculty of Humanities and Social Sciences, comprising 70 researchers from the UK, the EU and overseas. ACE offers MPhil/PhD programmes in Archaeology, Classics & Ancient History and Egyptology to Home/EU applicants on a full-time or part-time basis, and to overseas applicants on a full-time basis. ACE Postgraduate Researchers are financially supported primarily through scholarships provided by the AHRC and other sources of funding administered by the University of Liverpool. In 2016 the department secured 5 AHRC scholarships: 2 in Archaeology (Archaeobotanical Science/Anthracology), 1 in Archaeology (Human Evolution) and 2 in Classics. 5 Graduate Teaching Fellows were also appointed in 2016 in the fields of Prehistoric Archaeology, Egyptology, Archaeomaterials, Ancient Near East and Classics supported by ACE endowment funds.

== Notable people ==
Notable academics in the study of archaeology and ancient civilisations at Liverpool include:

- Kenneth Kitchen, Professor Emeritus of Egyptology and Honorary Research Fellow
- Christopher B. Mee, Charles W. Jones Professor of Classical Archaeology
- Alan Ralph Millard, Rankin Professor Emeritus of Hebrew and Ancient Semitic languages
- A. F. Shore, Brunner Professor of Egyptology (1974 to 1991)
- Elizabeth Slater, Garstang Professor of Archaeology and Dean of the Faculty of Arts
- Frank William Walbank, Rathbone Professor of Ancient History and Classical Archaeology (1951 to 1977)
