= Periodisation of Roman civilisation =

Epistemology of Roman civilisation's history

The periodisation of Roman Civilisation covers historical interpretations developed during the modern era of the Roman res publica (known as Rome). This incorporates the Roman Kingdom, Roman Republic, Roman Empire, the Western Roman Empire, and the Eastern Roman Empire.

Differing opinions exist on what type of continuity existed across the two-millennia era of Rome's history, as well as when different periods start, what they are called and why they are different. Although Rome the state started in the City of Rome, over time it would expand outside of the city and eventually the city was not part of the state. The dominance and control of the city of Rome underlined some of the contemporary disputes over who could claim to be representing the Roman people, which continues today in disputes over modern historiography. Competing interpretations have been motivated to define the origin of Western civilization.

== Overview ==
The major narrative for over 200 years since its publication in 1776 has been taken primarily from historian Edward Gibbon's The History of the Decline and Fall of the Roman Empire, who began the modern English study of Roman history. His work made a profound impression on Theodor Mommsen and Ronald Syme, who in turn shaped the views of modern historians. It was not until 1936 that scholars such as Arnaldo Momigliano began to question Gibbon's view.

The Belgian medieval historian Henri Pirenne considered the history and economy of post-Roman Europe with his central tenet, the influential Pirenne thesis, that the overthrow of the Roman supremacy by the Arabs broke the economic unity of the Mediterranean world. The anti-German sentiment of the French historians Piganiol (1947) and Courcelle (1948) led them to take a different view and ascribe the fall of the Western Roman Empire to the barbarous German tribe.

In 1953, art historian Alois Riegl provided the first true departure, writing that there were no qualitative differences in art and no periods of decline throughout Late Antiquity. In 1975, the concept of "history" was expanded to include sources outside ancient historical narrative and traditional literary works. The evidentiary basis expanded to include legal practices, economics, the history of ideas, coins, gravestones, architecture, archaeology and more. In the 1980s, syntheses began to pull together the results of this more detailed work.

Anthony Kaldellis, a post-classical scholar of the 21st century, has been challenging how we define Roman history.

"Labels are important, but so are the narratives that sustain them. It is from stories that identities derive their essence, and the narrative of Byzantium is a Roman one as well as a Christian one. That may put it on a bigger map. In finding itself again, Romanía can change our understanding of Roman history broadly. § We should think Big, in bigger terms even than the 1,123 years that elapsed between the foundation and conquest of Constantinople. Let’s try to think even bigger, remembering that “Byzantium” was invented through an attempt to pare history down to a manageable size, by postulating that one phase of the Roman empire was “essentially” different from the others, thereby cutting Roman history into smaller bits. Other than scholarly convenience, there is no good reason to do this. There was only ever one Roman res publica. It began as a city on the Tiber in Italy, expanded to encompass a huge empire, and, in the process, it became an idea: the city had become a world, to which the name Romanía was given by the fourth century AD. [...] There were no major turning points in the history of Rome / New Rome that require us to invent new labels or essences. It was all one history. Is our historical vision broad enough for this conception?"

== Periodisation ==
Italian humanists Leonardo Bruni, Flavio Biondo and Petrach provided the model that the Roman Empire fell due to barbarian invaders. It was their ancestral civilisation and they were reacting to German incursions in Italy and the Holy Roman Empire’s claim to be successors of Rome. This was followed by the Protestant Reformation, where the Lutherans supported the view, as it aligned with when the Papacy started its 1000-year dominance, though their motive was to frame it against religious corruption and not Germanic invasions of Italy. This view would further magnify during the Enlightenment’s battle against the church and be captured for posterity with Edward Gibbon's Opus Magnum.

Enlightenment figures had a millennium-long prejudice against European history, for this new abstraction that was now being called the Middle Ages. Gibbon's history, with its criticism of medieval Christianity, neatly aligned with the emerging tripartite periodisation that was developing in the West, with the history of Rome ending in 476 and the fall of Constantinople in 1453. However, it would be the invention of a second abstraction, the renaissance, that would develop the ancient, medieval and modern periodisation that would come to define Western history.

Jacob Burckhardt's creation of the Renaissance to explain the changes in Italy was a major historiographical event.

William Green claims "periodisation is among the most prominent and least scrutinised theoretical properties of history".

== Origin of Western Civilisation ==
Some view fall of Rome (with the western Roman Empire), influenced by Gibbon, as being constructed by European and American intellectuals who feared the collapse of the 18th-century civilisation they belonged to. According to Edward J. Watts, it was influenced by Marcellinus Comes to frame Justinian's war on Italy in a certain way. This view was challenged by what we now call Late Antiquity.

The term Spätantike, literally "late antiquity", has been used by German-speaking historians since its popularization by Alois Riegl in the early 20th century. It was given currency in English partly by the writings of Peter Brown, whose survey The World of Late Antiquity (1971) revised the Gibbon view of a stale and ossified Classical culture, in favour of a vibrant time of renewals and beginnings, and whose The Making of Late Antiquity offered a new paradigm of understanding the changes in Western culture of the time in order to confront Sir Richard Southern's The Making of the Middle Ages.

Anthony Kaldellis's The New Roman Empire: a history of Byzantium is a modern graduate-level narrative of the eastern Roman Empire. His history aims to dismantle "obsolete ideologies and the cognitive dissonance required to maintain them" and posits that the eastern Roman Empire is the actual origin of the West's core elements, and not Ancient Rome.

== Terms and dates ==
=== Ancient Rome ===
The tradition states Rome was founded on 21 April 753 BC. However, archaeological evidence does not align with this. Pottery shards discovered in the Forum Boarium indicate human activity in the area around the Bronze Age.

Mary Beard points to the Constitutio Antoniniana as a fundamental turning point, after which Rome was "effectively a new state masquerading under an old name".

=== Roman Empire and related ===
Also related: "Low Roman Empire"

Historians consider Augustus the first Roman emperor, though there was no formal office of emperor as Augustus took various Republican roles. Mary Beard claims the Empire's creation predates the Emperor and that Pompey makes a good claim to be the first emperor.

The term later Roman Empire was first used by J. B. Bury. It was replaced by late antiquity as the dominant paradigm in the second half of the 20th century by historians.

German historians consider the Roman imperial period as starting with the accession of Augustus in 27 BC and ending with the conclusion of the crisis of the third century in AD 284.

==== Principate and Dominate ====
Mommsen and the English constitutionalist school have long defined the powers of the emperor as legally conferred on him. Mommsen's distinction had the effect of showing the sharp 'Republican' contrast of the principate with the Dominate, with the latter having reference to the Persian imperial court. Mommsen's approach was eventually rejected by historians, partly because he exaggerated the role law played in the course of Roman state formation. Following Syme's shift in viewing Roman history, the principate is now seen as a variant of monarchy.

Jochen Bleicken believes the terms Principate and Dominate used in modern scholarship for periodisation are not suitable. Its usage has less to do with the Romans and more to do with the citizens of the 19th and 20th centuries, contrasting the freedoms of earlier times with the despots of later times, linked with the Napoleons and other despots of their time whom they had thrown out.

=== Eastern Roman Empire and Western Roman Empire ===
Orientale imperium and Occidentale imperium started being used to refer to the two parts of the Empire by the early fifth century. Orientale imperium may have first been used earlier when referring to the period when Zenobia controlled the east. Orientale imperium was highly uncommon in classical and late antique Latin, and its use was more after the 6th century.

=== Byzantine Empire and Empire of the Greeks ===
Starting with Charlemagne's Libri Carolini in the 790s, the Franks used the term "Empire of the Greeks" (Latin: Imperium Graecorum) and attacked the legitimacy of the eastern Roman Empire. This term held sway in Western-European written history until the 19th century to describe the Empire, despite the contemporary inhabitants and competing western-Asian empires elsewhere still calling them Roman (or Rûm).

Initially, "Byzantine" referred to the inhabitants of Constantinople. It was only following the demise of the Empire in the 15th century that Laonikos Chalkokondyles first used the word "Byzantine" to describe the state. Hieronymus Wolf's 1557 Historiæ Byzantinæ, which includes Chalkokondyles, marks the start of Byzantine studies. Du Cange, Montesquieu and Finlay popularised the term through their works. "Byzantine" was used adjectivally alongside terms such as "Empire of the Greeks" until the 19th century.

According to Anthony Kaldellis

The Crimean War had a profound—and unrecognized—impact by forging a new distinction between "Byzantine/Byzantium" and "Greek/Greece," in a context in which the "Empire of the Greeks" had become a politically toxic concept to the Great Powers of Europe. In response, European intellectuals increasingly began to lean on the conceptually adjacent and neutral term Byzantium in order to create a semantic bulwark between the acceptable national aspirations of the new Greek state, on the one hand, and its dangerous imperial fantasies and its (perceived) Russian patrons, on the other.

The start date varies according to differing interpretations. Some use the Diocletian reforms, the foundation of Constantinople, council of Chalcedon in 451, the fall of the western Roman Empire, the loss of lands to the Arabs or the proclamation of Charlemagne as dates when the eastern Roman Empire became the Byzantine Empire. The traditional view set by Gibbon and the revised view by Late Antiquity historians that emerged from Germany and England dominate the interpretations. Newer scholarship, such as by Anthony Kaldellis, rejects the term altogether and argues that there was no start date, as it was a continuation of the Roman Empire.

=== Terms used by the inhabitants ===
- The names the inhabitants used for their state in the post-classical era were ‘Imperium Romanum’, Ῥωμαίων Βασιλεία, Ῥωμαίων Πολιτεία, ‘Ρωμανία’, Ῥωμαίων αρχή, Ῥωμαίων ηγεμονία

=== Specific issues that question the continuity of the state ===
Historians have explored how the lives of ordinary Romans were different, which supports the differing views of the changed state of Rome. They include:

- νόμος ἔμψυχος, nómos émpsychos, the "living law" (also Lex animata). Augustus insisted that he was not νόμος ἔμψυχος—he was subject to the law but everyone else was answerable to him. This contrasts with the period from 364 CE onwards, when Themistius began to express court ideology that emperors were considered νόμος ἔμψυχος, nómos émpsychos. (This would later be codified by Justinian and be known in medieval Europe as the Lex animata)
- Constantinian shift
- The toga, which has long been seen as the symbol of the Roman citizen. This changed over time, and dress—like language—was useful in defining Roman identity in a society where this identity was unstable. This was due to the composition of the ruling class changing with extended Roman citizenship as well as external cultural influences.
- Roman religion was originally paganism, which morphed into Christianity. Historians previously viewed Roman religion as something that coincided with the empire's decline and Christianity as a form of social control, whereas modern historians now see it as central to understanding culture. Edward Gibbon held the view that Christianity is what corrupted the Roman Empire and led to its demise, whereas Anthony Kaldellis views Christianity as bringing no economic, social, or political changes to the state other than being more deeply integrated into it.
- Roman language has been emphasised, with Latin and Greek distinguishing what is Roman. This view was heavily influenced by Theodor Mommsen, who had the view that language was a crucial vehicle for national integration. Historians now regard this as a product of the times he lived in, where "nation", "state" and "national language" were becoming closer.

== See also ==
- Roman historiography
- Historiography of Romanisation
- Historiography of the fall of the Western Roman Empire
- Historiography of Christianization of the Roman Empire
- Byzantinism

== Bibliography ==
- Aschenbrenner, Nathanael; Ransohoff, Jake (2022). The Invention of Byzantium in Early Modern Europe. Washington DC: Harvard University Press. ISBN 978-0-88402-484-2.
  - Aschenbrenner, Nathanael; Ransohoff, Jake (2022a). Introduction. In Aschenbrenner & Ransohoff (2022), pp. 1–23.
  - Kaldellis, Anthony (2022a). "From "Empire of the Greeks" to "Byzantium"". In Aschenbrenner & Ransohoff (2022), pp. 349–367.
- Bleicken, Jochen (1978). Prinzipat und Dominat : Gedanken zur Periodisierung d. röm. Kaiserzeit. Internet Archive. Wiesbaden : Steiner. ISBN 978-3-515-02876-9.
- Browning, Robert (1992). The Byzantine Empire. Washington, DC: The Catholic University of America Press. ISBN 978-0-8132-0754-4.
- Cornell, Tim J. (1995). The beginnings of Rome: Italy and Rome from the Bronze Age to the Punic Wars (c. 1000–264 BC). Routledge. OCLC 31515793.
- El-Cheikh, Nadia Maria (2004). Byzantium Viewed by the Arabs. Cambridge, MA: Harvard University Press. ISBN 978-0-932885-30-2.
- Hay, Paul (2023). Saeculum: defining historical eras in ancient Roman thought. Austin: University of Texas Press. ISBN 9781477327395.
- Green, William A. (1992). "Periodization in European and World History". Journal of World History. 3 (1): 13–53. ISSN 1045-6007. JSTOR 20078511.
- Jordan, David P. (1969). "Gibbon's "Age of Constantine" and the Fall of Rome". History and Theory. 8 (1): 71–96. doi:10.2307/2504190. JSTOR 2504190.
- Rives, James B. (2010). "Graeco-Roman Religion in the Roman Empire: Old Assumptions and New Approaches". Currents in Biblical Research. 8 (2): 240–299. doi:10.1177/1476993X09347454. S2CID 161124650.
- Tarasov, Oleg; Milner-Gulland, R.R. (2004). Icon and Devotion: Sacred Spaces in Imperial Russia. London: Reaktion. ISBN 978-1-86189-118-1.
- Testa, Rita Lizzi (2007). "Christian emperor, vestal virgins and priestly colleges: Reconsidering the end of roman paganism". Antiquité tardive. 15: 251–262. doi:10.1484/J.AT.2.303121.
- Salzman, Michele Renee; Sághy, Marianne; Testa, Rita Lizzi, eds. (2016). Pagans and Christians in Late Antique Rome: Conflict, Competition, and Coexistence in the Fourth Century. Cambridge: Cambridge University Press. ISBN 978-1-107-11030-4.
- Testa, Rita Lizzi, ed. (2017). Late Antiquity in Contemporary Debate. Newcastle upon Tyne: Cambridge Scholars Publishing. ISBN 978-1-4438-7656-8.
- Ivanova, Mirela; Anderson, Benjamin (2024-10-01). "The Politics of Byzantine Studies: Between Nations and Empires". The English Historical Review. 139 (600): 1230–1249. doi:10.1093/ehr/ceae159. ISSN 0013-8266.
- Haarer, F. K. (2010), "Writing Histories of Byzantium: The Historiography of Byzantine History", A Companion to Byzantium, John Wiley & Sons, Ltd, pp. 9–21, doi:10.1002/9781444320015.ch2, ISBN 978-1-4443-2001-5
