= Oliver Gurney =

English Assyriologist (1911–2001)

- Born: 28 January 1911; London
- Died: 11 January 2001 (aged 89)
- Occupation: Assyriologist
- Spouse: Diane Grazebrook (m. 1957)

Oliver Robert Gurney (28 January 1911 – 11 January 2001) was an English Assyriologist from the Gurney family and a leading scholar of the Hittites.

== Early life ==
Gurney was born in London in 1911, the son of Robert Gurney, a zoologist, and a nephew of the archaeologist John Garstang. He was educated at Eton College and New College, Oxford, where he studied classics, graduating in 1933.

His uncle John Garstang excited the young Gurney's interest in Hittite studies, then in its infancy, and after a course in Akkadian at Oxford University in 1934-35, he went to the University of Berlin to study Hittite under Hans Ehelolf.

During the Second World War he joined the Royal Artillery, and served with the Sudan Defence Force.

== Academic career ==
On his return to Oxford in 1945, Gurney accepted the post of Reader in Assyriology, a post he held until his retirement in 1978. In 1948, he joined the council of management of the British Institute of Archaeology at Ankara, founded by his uncle, and maintained his links with the Institute for the rest of his life, serving as President from 1982. From 1956 to 1996 he edited the Institute's journal, Anatolian Studies.

He was elected a Fellow of the British Academy in 1959 and a Fellow of Magdalen College, Oxford, in 1963. In 1965, the University conferred on him the title of Professor.

Gurney wrote the classic text on The Hittites, published by Penguin in 1952 and in print for many years.

He married Diane Grazebrook in 1957 and had one stepdaughter, Carol Gurney. Both outlived him.

== Works ==
- The Hittites. Penguin. 1952. ISBN 0-14-020259-5.
- The Geography of the Hittite Empire. 1959. (with John Garstang)
- Anatolia c.1750 - 1600 B.C. Cambridge University Press. 1962.
- Some Aspects of Hittite Religion Oxford University Press (1977) ISBN 978-0-19-725974-0
- The Middle Babylonian Legal and Economic Texts From Ur. 1989.
