= Romanization (cultural) =

Cultural assimilation to ancient Rome

Romanization or Latinization (Romanisation or Latinisation), in the historical and cultural meanings of both terms, indicate different historical processes, such as acculturation, integration and assimilation of newly incorporated and peripheral populations by the Roman Republic and the later Roman Empire. The terms were used in ancient Roman historiography and traditional Italian historiography until the Fascist period, when the various processes were called the "civilizing of barbarians".

== Characteristics ==
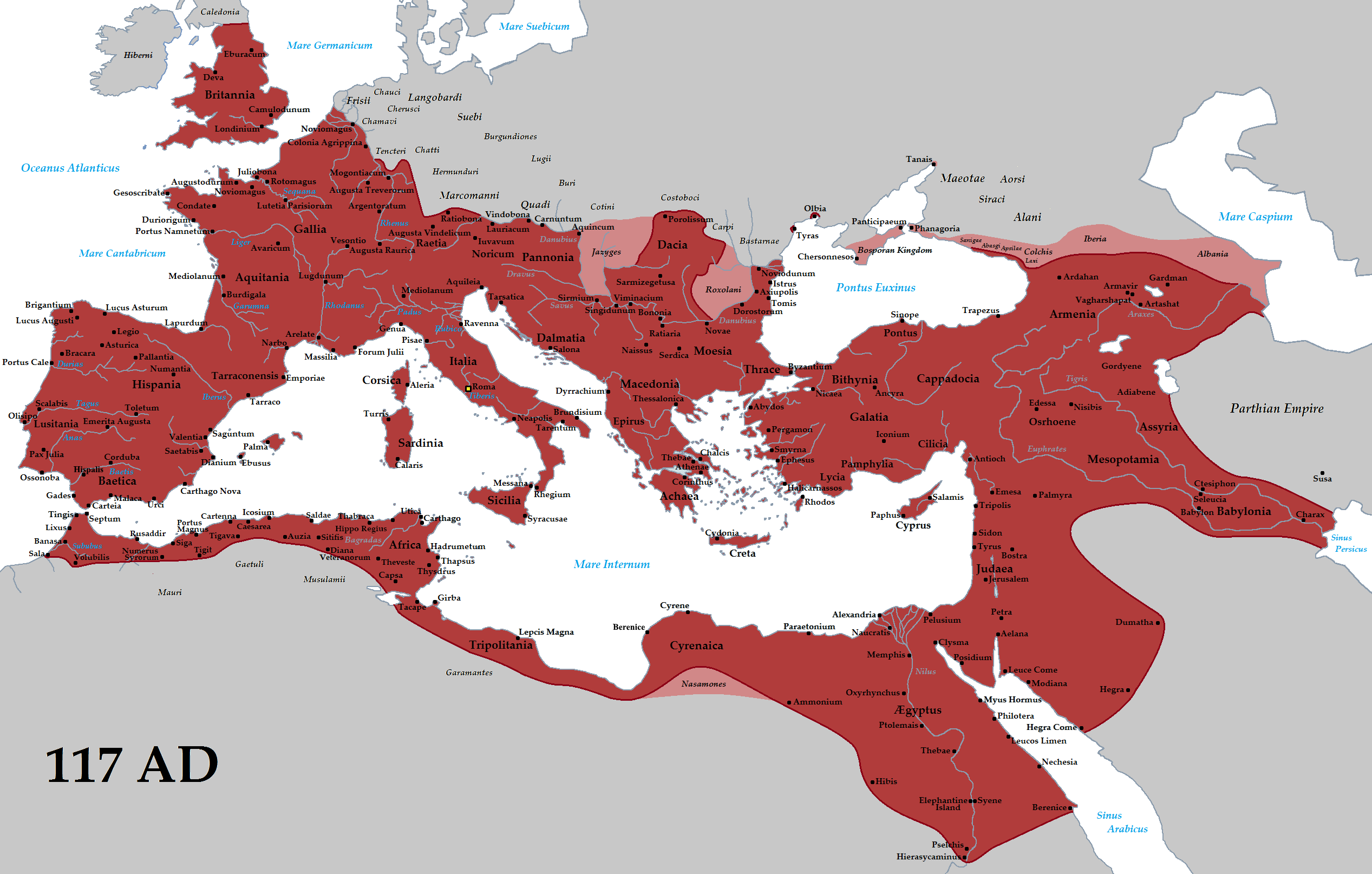
The Roman Empire at its greatest extent

Acculturation proceeded from the top down, with the upper classes adopting Roman culture first and the old ways lingering longest among peasants in outlying countryside and rural areas. Hostages played an important part in this process, as elite children from Mauretania to Gaul were taken to be raised and educated in Rome.

Ancient Roman historiography and traditional Italian historiography confidently identified the different processes involved with a "civilization of barbarians". Modern historians take a more nuanced view: by making their peace with Rome, local elites could make their position more secure and reinforce their prestige. New themes include the study of personal and group values and the construction of identity, which is the personal aspect of ethnogenesis. The transitions operated differently in different provinces; as Blagg and Millett point out even a Roman province may be too broad a canvas to generalize.

One characteristic of cultural Romanization was the creation of many hundreds of Roman coloniae in the territory of the Roman Republic and the subsequent Roman Empire. Until Trajan, colonies were created by using retired veteran soldiers, mainly from the Italian peninsula, who promoted Roman customs and laws, with the use of Latin.

About 400 towns [of the Roman Empire] are known to have possessed the rank of colonia. During the empire, colonies were showcases of Roman culture and examples of the Roman way of life. The native population of the provinces could see how they were expected to live. Because of this function, the promotion of a town to the status of "Colonia civium Romanorum" implied that all citizens received full citizen rights and dedicated a temple to the Capitoline triad: Jupiter, Juno, and Minerva, the deities venerated in the temple of Jupiter Best and Biggest on the Capitol in Rome. Livius

It has been estimated that at the beginning of the empire, about 750,000 Italians lived in the provinces. Julius Caesar, Mark Antony and Augustus settled many of their veterans in colonies: in Italy, and the provinces. The colonies that were established in Italy until 14 BCE have been studied by Keppie (1983). In his account of the achievements of his long reign, Res Gestae Divi Augusti (The Deeds of the Divine Augustus), Augustus stated that he had settled 120,000 soldiers in twenty colonies in Italy in 31 BCE, then 100,000 men in colonies in Spain and southern Gaul in 14 BCE, followed by another 96,000 in 2 BCE. Brian Campbell also states "From 49 to 32 BCE about 420,000 Italians were recruited", which would thus be the veteran (citizen) stock that was largely sent to the provinces (colonies) during Augustus. The Lex Calpurnia, however, also allowed citizenship to be granted for distinguished bravery. For example, the 1,000 socii from Camerinum after Vercellae 101 BCE (Plutarch Mar. XXXVIII) and the auxiliary (later Legio XXII Deiotariana) after Zela, were granted Roman citizenship. By the time of Augustus, the legions consisted mostly of ethnic Latins/Italics and Cisalpine Gauls.

However, Romanization did not always result in the extinction of all aspects of native cultures even when there was extensive acculturation. Many non-Latin provincial languages survived the entire period while sustaining considerable Latin influence, including the ancestor languages of Welsh, Albanian, Basque and Berber. Where there was language replacement, in some cases, such as Italy, it took place in the early imperial stage, while in others, native languages only totally succumbed to Latin after the fall of the Empire, as was likely the case with Gaulish. The Gaulish language is thought to have survived into the 6th century in France, despite considerable Romanization of the local material culture. The last record of spoken Gaulish deemed to be plausibly credible was when Gregory of Tours wrote in the 6th century (c. 560–575) that a shrine in Auvergne which "is called Vasso Galatae in the Gallic tongue" was destroyed and burnt to the ground. Coexisting with Latin, Gaulish helped shape the Vulgar Latin dialects that developed into French, with effects including loanwords and calques (including oui, the word for "yes"), sound changes, and influences in conjugation and word order.

== Process ==
The very existence of Romanization is a source of contention among modern archaeologists. One of the first approaches, which now can be regarded as the "traditional" approach, was taken by Francis Haverfield. He saw this process beginning in primarily post-conquest societies (such as Britain and Gaul), where direct Roman policy from the top promoted an increase in the Roman population of the province through the establishment of veteran colonies. The coloniae would have spoken Latin and been citizens of Rome following their army tenure (See Roman citizenship). Haverfield thus assumes this would have a Romanizing effect upon the native communities.

This thought process, fueled though it was by early 20th century standards of imperialism and cultural change, forms the basis for the modern understanding of Romanization. However, recent scholarship has devoted itself to providing alternate models of how native populations adopted Roman culture and has questioned the extent to which it was accepted or resisted.

1. Non-interventionist model – Native elites were encouraged to increase social standing through association with the powerful conqueror, be it in dress, language, housing or food consumption. This would have provided them with associated power. The establishment of a civil administration system is quickly imposed to solidify the permanence of Roman rule.
2. Discrepant identity – No uniformity of identity that can accurately be described as traditional Romanization. Fundamental differences within a province are visible through economics, religion and identity. Not all provincials supported Rome and not all elites wanted to be like the Roman upper classes.
3. Acculturation – Aspects of both native and Roman cultures are joined together, as can be seen in the Roman acceptance, and adoption of, non-Classical religious practices. The inclusion of Isis, Epona, Britannia and Dolichenus into the pantheon are evidence.
4. Creolization – Romanization occurs as a result of negotiation between different elements of non-egalitarian societies and so material culture is ambiguous.

== Legacy ==
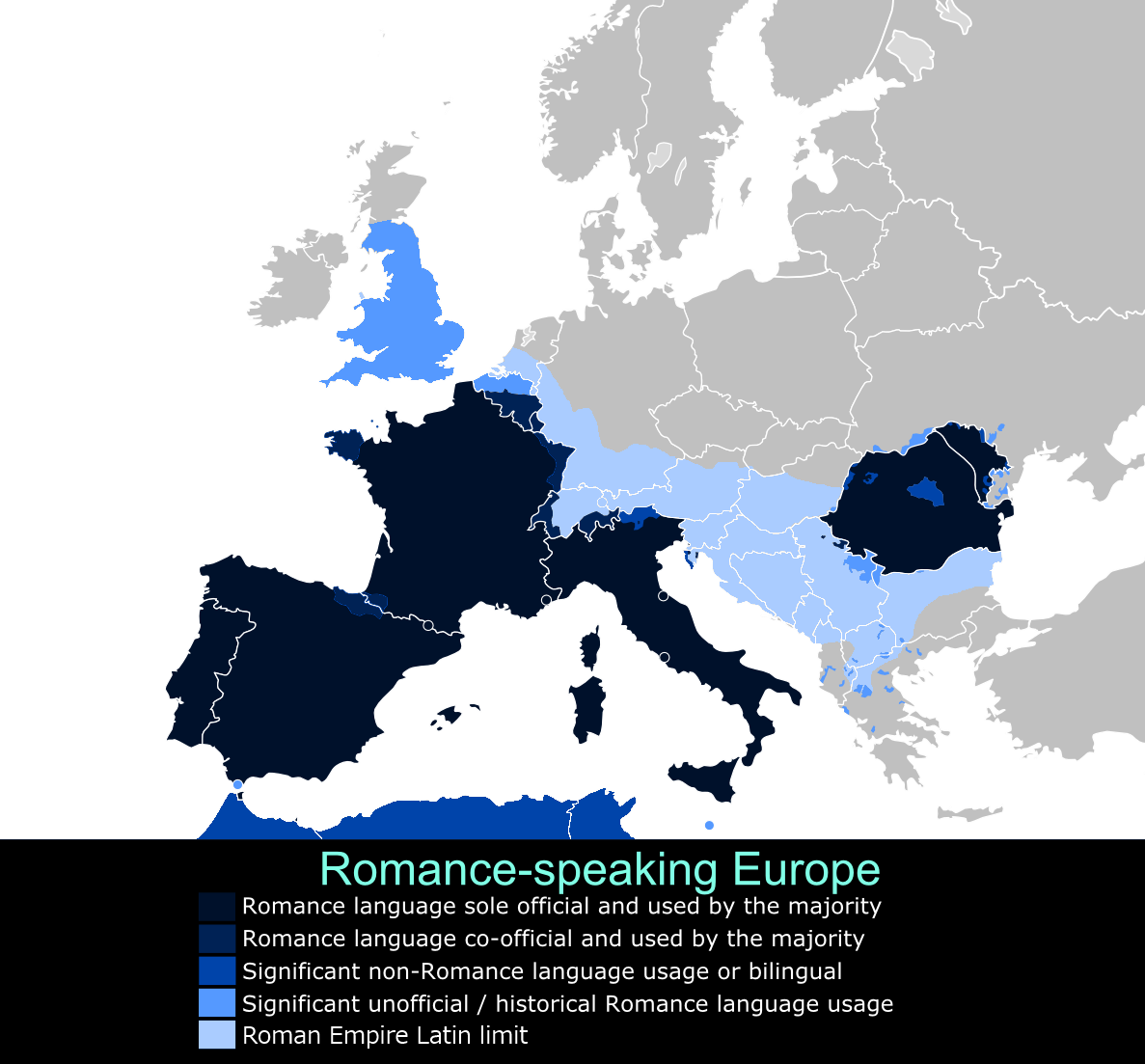
Romance languages in Europe

Roman names were adopted by some, and the Latin language was spread, which was greatly facilitated by the fact that many cultures were mostly oral (particularly for the Gauls and Iberians). Anyone who wanted to deal (through writing) with the bureaucracy and/or with the Roman market had to write in Latin. The extent of the adoption is subject to ongoing debate, as the native languages were certainly spoken after the conquests. Moreover, in the eastern half of the Empire, Latin had to compete with Greek, which largely kept its position as lingua franca and even spread to new areas. Latin became prominent in certain areas around new veteran colonies like Berytus.

The local customary laws were supplanted in part by Roman law, with its institutions regarding property and inheritance.

Typically-Roman institutions, such as public baths, the imperial cult and gladiator fights, were adopted.

Gradually, the conquered would see themselves as Romans. The process was supported by the Roman Republic and then by the Roman Empire.

The entire process was facilitated by the Indo-European origin of most of the languages and by the similarity of the gods of many ancient cultures. They also already had trade relations and contacts with one another through the seafaring Mediterranean cultures like the Phoenicians and the Greeks.

Romanization was largely effective in the western half of the empire, where native civilizations were weaker. In the Hellenized east, ancient civilizations like those of Ancient Egypt, Anatolia, the Balkans, and Syria effectively resisted all but its most superficial effects. When the Empire was divided, the east, with mainly Greek culture, was marked by the increasing strength of specifically Greek culture and language to the detriment of the Latin language and other Romanizing influences, but its citizens continued to regard themselves as Romans.

While Britain certainly was Romanized, its approximation to the Roman culture seems to have been smaller than that of Gaul. The most Romanized regions, as demonstrated by Tewes and Woitas were: Italy, the Iberian Peninsula, Gaul, southern Germany and Dalmatia.

Romanization in most of those regions remains such a powerful cultural influence in most aspects of life today that they are described as "Latin countries". That is most evident in European countries in which Romance languages are spoken and former colonies that have inherited the languages and other Roman influences. According to Theodor Mommsen, cultural Romanization was more complete in those areas that developed a "neolatin language" (like Spanish, French, Italian, Portuguese, and Romanian). The same process later developed in the recent centuries' colonial empires.

== De-Romanization ==
The regions of Levant and Mesopotamia were re-Semiticized by the Muslim conquests of the Rashidun and the Umayyad Caliphates and into the Abbasid Caliphate after centuries of Roman rule. The conquests reversed the Romanization and the Hellenization of the native Semitic peoples.

Slavic migrations to the Balkans also contributed to the de-Romanization of the Balkans, and the rapid demographic spread of the Slavs was followed by a population exchange, mixing and language shift to and from Slavic.

Anglo-Saxon settlement of Britain contributed to the de-Romanization of Great Britain, that underwent a process of anglicisation.

== Examples ==
- Romanization of Anatolia
- Romanization of Hispania

== Heritage ==
- Latinization of names
- List of cities founded by the Romans
- Spread of the Latin script
- Historiography of Romanization

== See also ==
- Romanitas
- Roman citizenship
- Latin rights
- Interpretatio romana
- Gallo-Roman culture
