= Elizabeth Slater =

British archaeologist

Elizabeth Anne Slater
- Born: 13 June 1946; Preston, Lancashire
- Died: 11 September 2014 (aged 68); Hoylake, Merseyside

Academic background
- Education: University of Cambridge (BA, 1969; PhD, 1973)
- Thesis: Metallurgical Aspects of Bronze Age Technology (1973)

Academic work
- Discipline: Archaeologist
- Sub-discipline: Archaeometallurgy
- Institutions: University of Glasgow (1974–1991); University of Liverpool (1991–2007)

Elizabeth Slater (13 June 1946 – 11 September 2014) was a British archaeologist specialising in archaeometallurgy. She was the first female professor of archaeology appointed by the University of Liverpool, where she held the Garstang Chair in Archaeology from 1991 to 2007.

== Early life and education ==
Elizabeth Anne Slater was born in Preston, Lancashire on 13 June 1946, the daughter of two school teachers. She was educated at a girl's grammar school before going to study at New Hall College, Cambridge, where she gained a BA in Natural Sciences in 1969. Slater developed an interest in the history of metallurgy while working with archaeological materials and went on to undertake postgraduate research on Bronze Age metallurgy at the University of Cambridge. She completed a PhD in 1973 on “Metallurgical Aspects of Bronze Age Technology” with an emphasis on the interpretation of analytical data.

== Academic career ==
In 1974 Slater joined the Department of Archaeology, chaired by Professor Leslie Alcock, at University of Glasgow, as lecturer in archaeological sciences. Slater remained at the University of Glasgow until 1991 when she took up the Garstang Chair in Archaeology and became the first female professor of the University of Liverpool Department of Archaeology, Classics and Egyptology. Slater undertook extensive analytical research on copper metals, ceramics and other vitreous materials as part of major field work and excavation programmes in the UK, Italy, Greece, Turkey and Egypt. She had an interest in experimental archaeology and undertook experimental projects to study pyrotechnological processes and explore the processing of raw materials into completed artefacts.

Slater remained at the University of Liverpool until her retirement in 2007 and subsequently devoted her time to travel and charity work. She died near her home in Hoylake on 11 September 2014, and was cremated at Landican Crematorium, Birkenhead.

== Professor Elizabeth Slater Archaeological Research Laboratories ==
In 2015 the University of Liverpool opened the new Professor Elizabeth Slater Archaeological Research Laboratories in Abercromby Square. The facility houses a palaeodiet laboratory, imaging suite, ancient technologies workshop, GIS lab, a scanning electron microscope, microwave plasma atomic emission spectrometer, in addition to lithics and sample preparation laboratories.
