= Ar Raqāqinah =

- Location in Egypt
- Coordinates: 26°20′N 31°46′E
- Country: Egypt
- Governorate: New Valley Governorate
- Time zone: UTC+2 (EST)
  - Summer (DST): +3

Ar Raqāqinah, is a settlement in the New Valley Governorate of Egypt, approximately 30 km south of Sohag. It is next to Sohag International Airport and is the location of an ancient necropolis.

== Necropolis ==
The ancient necropolis, approximately 24 km from Abydos, was excavated by archaeologist John Garstang in 1901–1902. The excavation discovered burials which Garstang believed dated from the predynastic period through to the end of the Fifth Dynasty. The site contained many types of burials, including mastaba tombs, similar to those found at the nearby site of Beit Khallaf, pit tombs in enclosures, burials under large pots, and burials under arched vaults.

In the 1900-1901 excavation season, Garstang excavated sites between Abydos and Bêt Khallâf on behalf of the Egyptian Research Account. One of his major discoveries was the 3rd Dynasty mastaba tombs near Bêt Khallâf.

The next season, Garstang returned to Egypt to examine sites north of Bêt Khallâf with private funding from a committee, featuring notable Liverpool industrialists and representatives of museums. This was the first time Garstang's archaeological work was funded by an Excavation Committee, a funding method he used for the rest of his career. The Committee included William MacGregor (1848-1937), Henry Martyn Kennard (1833-1911), Ralph Brocklebank, Frederick George Hilton Price and Arthur Evans, keeper of the Ashmolean Museum. Garstang examine various sites including Bêt Dawd (designated site D); Sararwah to the north of Bêt Khallâf (designated site B); Reqaqnah (designated site R).

The majority of the season was spent excavating a necropolis discovered 0.5 km from the village of Reqaqnah (Ar Raqāqinah). The site comprised two large mounds naturally split by an ancient watercourse.

In the southern mound they discovered three large 3rd Dynasty stairway tombs (R1, R2, and R40), similar to the tombs discovered at Bet Khallaf in the previous season. They also discovered several smaller stairway tombs, including R14, which was incomplete.

In the Northern mound they discovered a systematically constructed necropolis, thought by Garstang to date from the early 3rd Dynasty to the 5th Dynasty. Garstang discovered three large mastaba tombs (R50, R70, and R75), as well as burials within mud brick enclosures; burials under mud brick vaults (in enclosures and without enclosures); shaft burials; and burials under upturned pots. Garstang also discovered some plundered tombs and graves which he believed dated from an earlier period. The team also locally bought pottery which was thought to date from the predynastic period.

Garstang also excavated smaller sites in the region and found burials of a much later date. At Bet Dawd they excavated the remains of Roman houses and a Greco-Roman cemetery where they discovered the stela of Se-Ra the sculptor dating from the 12th dynasty. At Sarawah they excavated tombs from the 19th Dynasty and a necropolis which Garstang thought was used from the 6th-11th Dynasties.
