= Marie Garstang =

British archaeologist (1880–1949)

Marie Garstang, born Marie Louise Bergès, (1880 near Toulouse – 25 July 1949 maybe in Formby) was a British archaeologist.

== Biography ==
In 1907, Marie married the British archaeologist and orientalist John Garstang and from then on shared her husband's fieldwork, especially in Sudan, Egypt and the Near East.

"It is difficult to determine the extent of her contribution to her husband's work. Her working relationship with John may have been one of intellectual collaboration, mutual interest and respect. She is mentioned in the introductions to John Garstang's publications and in his 1934 Jericho field report, John acknowledges Mary for her expertise in ceramic conservation."

During the third excavation session at Meroë (1911–1912), Marie Garstang joined her husband and Horst Schliephack on the excavation field. She can be seen with her husband examining fragments of a statue in the tank of the "Royal Baths" in Meroë in 1913. Marie Garstang was mainly responsible for assembling fragments from the excavations and many of the pieces on display in the Garstang Museum of Archaeology are the result of her work.

Marie served as a nurse with the Voluntary Aid Detachment during the World War I.

During a lecture before the Society of Antiquaries in 1947, on his work at Mersin, John Garstang publicly paid tribute to his wife for all the assistance she had given him during his working years.

"Whilst in England, Marie and John Garstang lived in Formby, near Liverpool, where Marie died in 1949. John died some years later, in Beirut, on the return journey from a holiday cruise. It was 1956 and he was eighty years old. John and Marie had two children, John Berges Garstang who died in 1965, aged 57 years, and, Meroe Fleming (born Garstang), who died in 1994 at the age of 79."
