= Sarah Scott (archaeologist) =

Archaeologist

Sarah A. Scott FSA SFHEA

Academic background
- Education: University of Oxford

Academic work
- Discipline: Archaeology
- Sub-discipline: Classical archaeology Historical archaeology
- Institutions: University of Durham; University of Leicester

Sarah A. Scott FSA SFHEA is an archaeologist and academic. She is professor of archaeology at the University of Leicester. Scott has a BSc degree from Leicester and completed her DPhil at University of Oxford. She taught at the University of Durham before moving to Leicester. In 2015 she became a Senior Fellow of the Higher Education Academy and in 2016 was in receipt of Advance HE's National Teaching Fellowship award. Scott was elected as a Fellow of the Society of Antiquaries of London on 5 May 2002.

== Select publications ==
- Scott, S., Savani, G., Ainsworth, J., Hunt, A. Kuhivchak, L. 2022. Roman worlds for diverse communities: Engaging new audiences with archaeology and classics. Journal of Community Archaeology and Heritage https://doi.org/10.1080/20518196.2022.2052482
- Scott, S. 2019. "Vetusta Monumenta and Britain's Classical Past", Vetusta Monumenta: Ancient Monuments, A Digital Edition
- Savani, G., Scott, S. and Morris, M. 2018. Life in the Roman World: Roman Leicester. Leicester, University of Leicester.
- Scott, S. 2017. "'Gratefully dedicated to the subscribers': The archaeological publishing projects and achievements of Charles Roach Smith". Internet Archaeology 45. doi:10.11141/ia.45.6
- Scott, S. 2014. "Britain in the classical world: Samuel Lysons and the art of Roman Britain 1780-1820". Classical Receptions Journal, 6 (2), 294–337. doi:10.1093/crj/clt030
- Scott, S. 2013. "Pioneers, publishers and the dissemination of archaeological knowledge. A study of publishing in archaeology 1816-1851". Internet Archaeology 35. doi:10.11141/ia.35.1
- Scott, S. 2006. "Art and the archaeologist". World Archaeology 38 (4), 628–643.
- Scott, S. and Webster, J. eds 2003. Roman Imperialism and Provincial Art. Cambridge, Cambridge University Press.
- Scott, S. 2000. Art and Society in Fourth-Century Britain (Oxford University School of Archaeology Monograph 53). Oxford Oxbow.
