= John Garstang (footballer) =

English footballer

Personal information
- Full name: John Garstang
- Date of birth: 12 November 1876
- Place of birth: Salford, England
- Date of death: 1957 (aged 80–81)
- Position: Centre forward

Senior career*
Years	Team	Apps	(Gls)
1896–1897	Blackburn Etrurians		
1898–1899	Blackburn Rovers	4	(0)
1899–1900	Chorley		
1901	Witton (Blackburn)		
1902	Blackburn Crosshill		
Total		4	(0)
- * Club domestic league appearances and goals

John Garstang (12 November 1876 – 1957) was an English footballer who played in the Football League for Blackburn Rovers.
