= Francis J. Haverfield =

British historian and archaeologist (1860–1919)

Francis J. Haverfield FBA
- Born: Francis John Haverfield; 8 November 1860; Shipston-on-Stour, Warwickshire, England
- Died: 1 October 1919 (aged 58); Headington Hill, Oxford, England
- Spouse: Winifred

Academic background
- Education: New College, Oxford
- Academic advisor: Theodor Mommsen

Academic work
- Discipline: Ancient history and archaeology
- Sub-discipline: Roman history; Roman Britain; Romanisation
- Institutions: Brasenose College, Oxford
- Notable students: Thomas Ashby; R. G. Collingwood; John Garstang

Francis John Haverfield, FBA (8 November 1860 – 1 October 1919) was an English ancient historian, archaeologist, and academic. From 1907 to 1919 he held the Camden Professorship of Ancient History at the University of Oxford.

== Education ==
Haverfield was educated at Winchester College and at New College, Oxford. At Oxford he gained a First in Classical Moderations in 1880 and a Second in Literae humaniores ('Greats', a combination of philosophy and ancient history) in 1883. He worked for a time under Theodor Mommsen. He won the Conington Prize at Oxford in 1891 and in the following year was appointed a Student [Fellow] of Christ Church, Oxford. In 1907 he moved to Brasenose College to become Camden Professor of Ancient History.

== Work ==
Haverfield was the first to undertake a scientific study of Roman Britain and is considered by some to be the first theorist to tackle the issue of the Romanization of the Roman Empire. Some consider him the innovator of the discipline of Romano-British archaeology. His works include The Romanization of Roman Britain (1905) (which originated as a lecture to the British Academy and for which he is best known), Ancient Town Planning (1913), and The Roman Occupation of Britain (1924), many monographs, and the authoritative chapters he contributed to the Victoria History of the Counties of England. He excavated the Roman fort at Hardknott, the site of ancient Mediobogdum in Cumbria. He collected and published known Latin inscriptions in Britain.

He gave the Rhind Lectures in 1905 and 1907, on Roman Britain.

Haverfield is credited as playing a prominent role in creation of both the Society for the Promotion of Roman Studies and the British School at Rome.

He was on the governing body of Abingdon School from 1907 to 1919 and was a supporter of the school.

== Legacy ==
Among his other substantial contributions to education, Haverfield bequeathed his papers and impressive library to the university, these were subsequently housed at the Ashmolean Museum. In 2001, Haverfield's material was transferred to the newly-built Sackler Library, and is now found in the Haverfield Archive section to the right hand side of the ground floor library. This archive consists of correspondence, coloured prints, and drawings illustrating mosaic pavements, site plans, publication extracts, although, this reportedly represents only a small fraction of Haverfield's papers. In addition, the archive holds valuable resources from European continental journals such as Romanobarbarica, including historical sources that Haverfield knew of and used in his work.

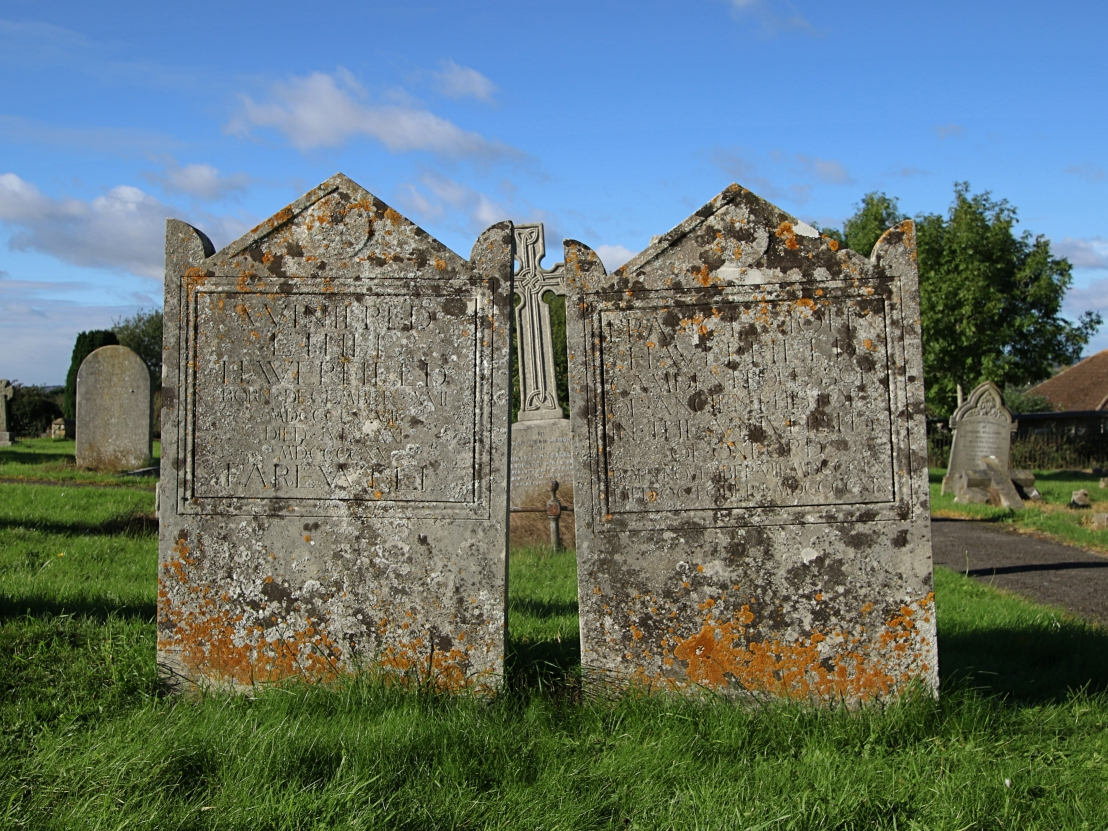
Gravestones of Francis Haverfield (right) and his wife Winifred (left) in Headington Cemetery, Oxford

== Students ==
Among his students was the archaeologist and topographer Thomas Ashby (1874–1931), the first scholar and third director of the British School at Rome, the Oxford historian, archaeologist, and philosopher R. G. Collingwood (1889–1943) and the archaeologist and anthropologist John Garstang (1876–1956).

== See also ==
- Sator square, topic on which Haverfield contributed to

Academic offices
Preceded by Henry Francis Pelham	Camden Professor of Ancient History; 1907–1919	Succeeded by Henry Stuart Jones
