= John Garstang =

British archaeologist (1876–1956)

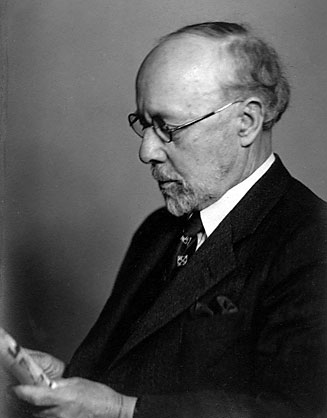
- Garstang in 1956
- Born: 5 May 1876; Blackburn, England
- Died: 12 September 1956 (aged 80); Beirut, Lebanon
- Education: Jesus College, Oxford
- Spouse: Marie Louise Berges
- Children: 2
- Scientific career
- Fields: Archaeology
- Workplaces: University of Liverpool, Department of Antiquities of Mandatory Palestine
- Doctoral advisor: Francis J. Haverfield

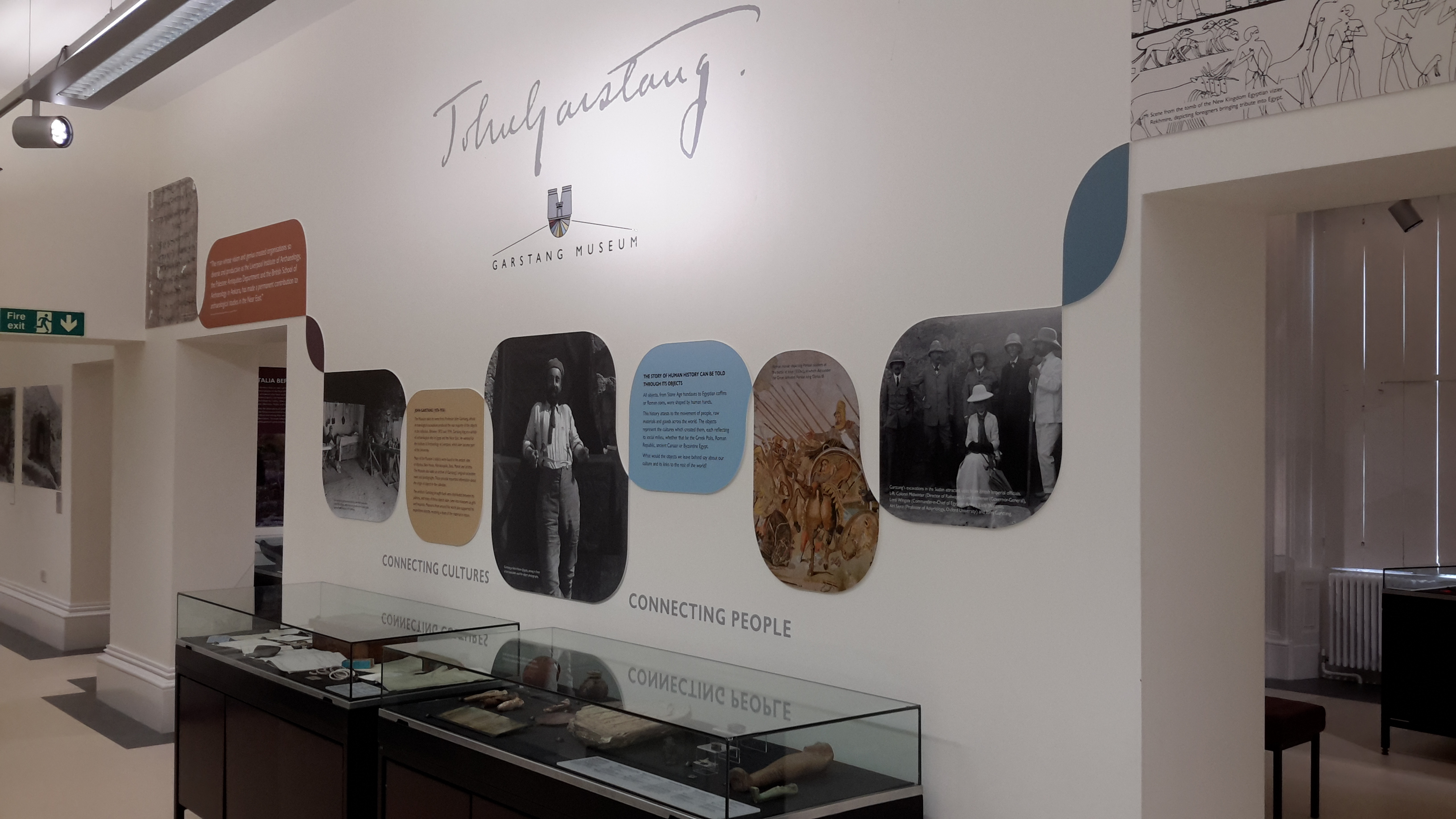
Garstang Museum of Archaeology, University of Liverpool. Redeveloped in 2014, the museum features artefacts and photographs from Garstang excavations in Egypt, Sudan, Anatolia and the Levant.

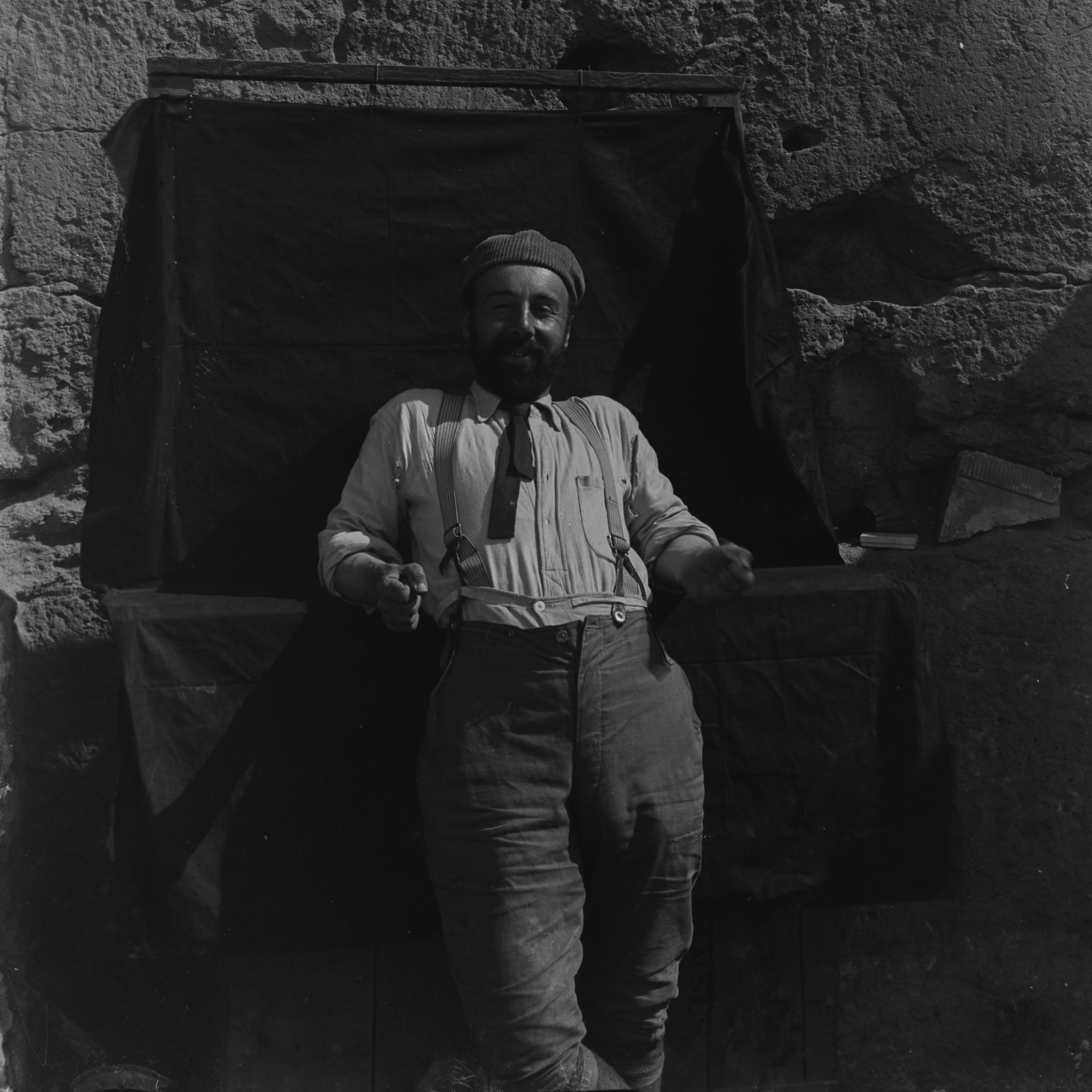
John Garstang on site at Beni Hassan, from the glass plate negative collection at the Garstang Museum of Archaeology.

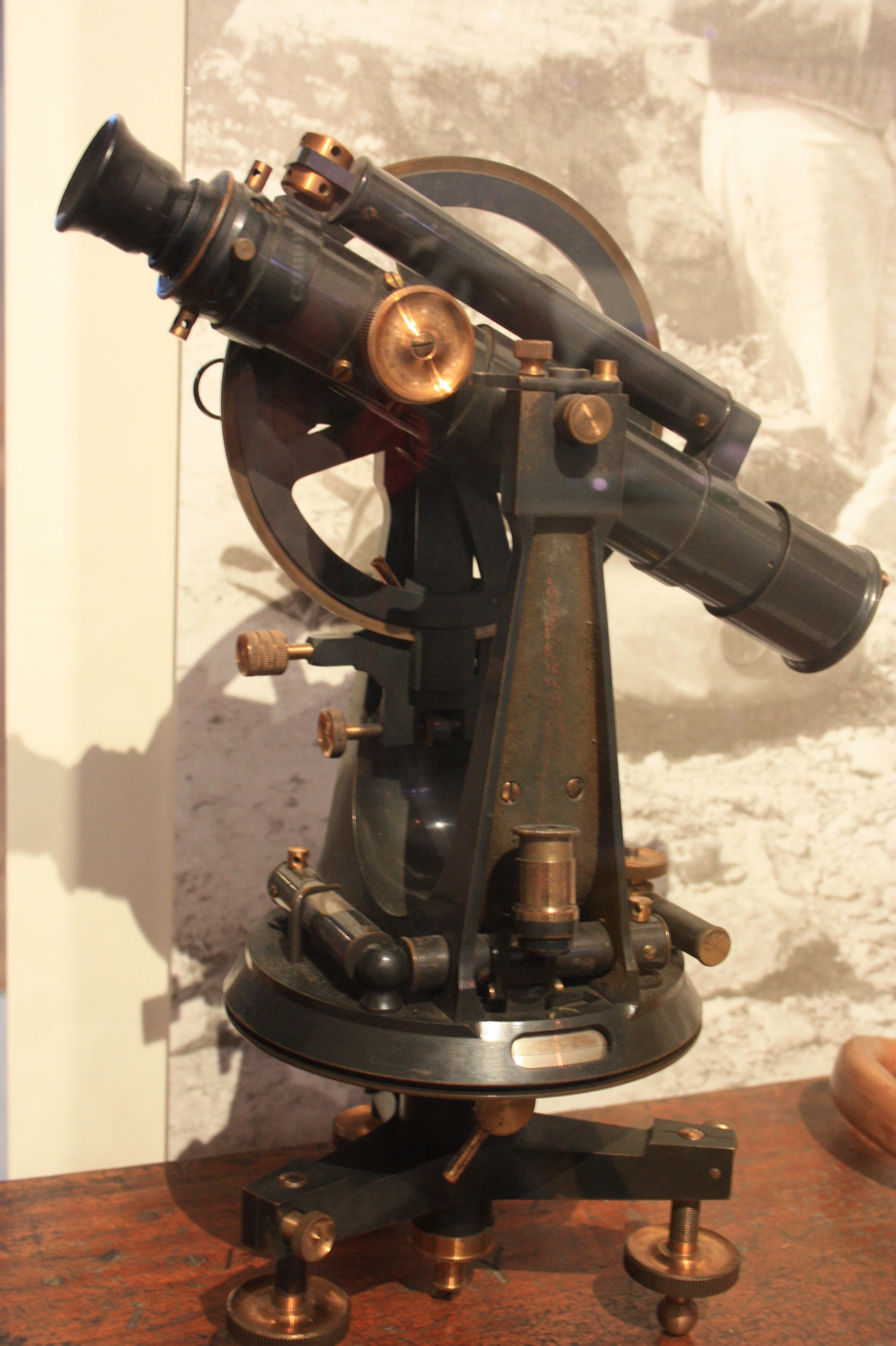
John Garstang's theodolite, Hunterian Museum, Glasgow

John Garstang (5 May 1876 – 12 September 1956) was a British archaeologist of the Ancient Near East, especially Egypt, Sudan, Anatolia and the southern Levant. He was the younger brother of Professor Walter Garstang, FRS, a marine biologist and zoologist. Garstang is considered a pioneer in the development of scientific practices in archaeology as he kept detailed records of his excavations with extensive photographic records, which was a comparatively rare practice in early 20th-century archaeology.

== Biography ==
John Garstang was born in Blackburn on 5 May 1876, the sixth child of Walter and Matilda Garstang. He was educated at Blackburn Grammar School and in 1895 he obtained a scholarship for Jesus College, Oxford to study mathematics. While at Oxford, Garstang became interested in archaeology and conducted excavations at Ribchester. Encouraged to take up archaeology, Garstang excavated other Romano-British sites during his vacations from Oxford.

After gaining a 3rd from Oxford in 1899, Garstang joined the team of Flinders Petrie at Abydos. He excavated various sites in the vicinity, including the discovery of the great tombs at Beit Khallaf in 1901. In 1902 he carried out his first independent excavation in Egypt at Reqaqnah. The excavation was funded by an excavation committee, a group of wealthy donors who in turn would receive a selection of objects from Garstang's excavations in exchange for their patronage. Like Petrie before him, Garstang would continue to use Excavation Committees to fund his excavations for most of his career.

In 1902, Garstang was also appointed the honorary reader in Egyptian archaeology at the University of Liverpool. In 1904, Garstang founded the Institute of Archaeology, which was affiliated with the university. Largely funded by private benefactors, the Institute contained both a library and a museum, intended to support the work of the staff and the teaching of its students. In 2004, this museum was officially renamed the Garstang Museum of Archaeology, to celebrate the centenary of the foundation of the Institute.

From 1907–41, Garstang was the first professorship in the methods and practice of archaeology at the university. On behalf of the institute, Garstang excavated sites in Egypt, Sudan and the Near East up to the out break of World War I. Some of his assistant excavators include E. Harold Jones, English artist and illustrator.

He served as the Director of the Department of Antiquities in the British Mandate of Palestine between 1920–26, and excavated at Ashkelon, 1920–21. He was also the Head of the British School of Archaeology in Jerusalem, 1919–26. He also carried out a major excavation of Jericho from 1930–36, funded by Sir Charles Marston.

He taught at the Egyptology section of the Faculty of Arts when this was established in the 1920s. One of his students was Pahor Labib, late Director of the Coptic Museum, Cairo.

From 1936 to the outbreak of World War II, Garstang excavated Yümük Tepe near Mersin. Garstang returned to Turkey after the War, and finished the excavation in 1948. In 1948, Garstang founded the British Institute of Archaeology at Ankara, assisted by other Anatolian archaeologists including Winifred Lamb, and acted as its first director (he was succeeded by Seton Lloyd).

== Personal life ==
Garstang married Marie Louise Berges, from France, in 1907. Over the years, Marie travelled extensively with him. "When in England, they lived in Formby, near Liverpool, where Marie died in 1949. He died some years later, in Beirut, on the return journey from a holiday cruise. It was 1956 and he was eighty years old. They had two children, John Berges Garstang who died in 1965, aged 57 years, and Meroe Fleming (born Garstang), who died in 1994 at the age of 79 years."

Garstang's posthumous monograph The Geography of the Hittite Empire was completed with the help of his sister R. Garstang and his colleague Oliver Gurney after John was disabled by illness in 1953. Gurney's wife, Diane Grazebrook, provided the maps.

== Excavations ==
Garstang excavated at various sites in his career, including:

- Bremetennacum (Ribchester), up to 1898;
- Ardotalia (Melandra), 1899;
- Rutupiae (Richborough Castle), 1900;
- Navio Roman Fort near Brough-on-Noe, 1903;
- Predynastic cemetery at Alawniyeh, 1900–1901;
- Predynastic settlement and Early Dynastic cemetery at El-Mahasna near Beit Khallaf, 1900–1901;
- Third dynasty mastaba tombs near Beit Khallaf, 1900–1901;
- Old Kingdom necropolis near Reqaqnah, 1901–1902;
- Beni Hasan, 1902–1904;
- Naqada, 1902–1904;
- Hierakonpolis, 1904–1906;
- Esna, 1905–1906 (Middle - New Kingdom necropolis);
- Ptolemaic graves west of Edfu, 1905-1906;
- Messawiyeh (south of Esna), 1905-1906 (Early Dynastic necropolis);
- El Kilh, 1905-1906 (Early Dynastic graves, between Hierakonpolis and Edfu);
- Hissayeh, 1905-1906 (Ptolemaic tombs);
- Dakka (Lower Nubia/Upper Egypt), 1905-1906 (New Kingdom burials);
- Koshtamna, Aswan region, Lower Nubia/Upper Egypt (few km down the Nile from the Temple of Dakka), 1905–1906; (A-Group - Middle Kingdom cemetery);
- Kubba (south of Dakka), 1905-1906 (Middle - New Kingdom burials, Byzantine fort);
- Abydos, Egypt, 1906–1909;
- Sakçagözü, 1908,1911;
- Meroë, 1909–1914;
- Ashkelon, 1920–1921;
- Dor (Tantura), 1923–1924, where a field school for the BSAJ students took place;
- Jericho, 1930–1936;
- Yümük Tepe near Mersin, 1948.

== Publications ==
- Garstang, John (1897). A History of Blackburn Grammar School. North-East Lancashire Press Co.
- ——— (1901). El Arábah: a cemetery of the Middle Kingdom: survey of the Old Kingdom temenos: graffiti from the temple of Sety. Egyptian Research Account. Vol. 6. London: Bernard Quaritich. OCLC 3904458.
- ——— (1903). Maḥâsna and Bêt Khallâf. Egyptian Research Account. Vol. 7. London: Bernard Quaritich. OCLC 3578216.
- ——— (1904). Tombs of the third Egyptian dynasty at Reqâqnah and Bêt Khallâf. Westminster: A rchibald Constable & Co. OCLC 4912003.
- ———; Newberry, Percy E. (1907). A Short History of Ancient Egypt. London: Archibald Constable & Co. OCLC 776949763.
- ——— (1907). The Burial Customs of Ancient Egypt as illustrated by tombs of the Middle Kingdom, being a report of excavations made in the necropolis of Beni Hassan during 1902-3-4. London: John Constable. OCLC 1862428.
- ——— (1910). The Land of the Hittites: an account of recent explorations and discoveries in Asia Minor, with descriptions of the Hittite monuments. London: Constable and Company, Ltd. OCLC 1932675.
- ——— (1911). Meroë, the city of the Ethiopians: being an account of a first season's excavations on the site, 1909-1910. Oxford: Clarendon Press. OCLC 4911995.
- ——— (1924). The excavations at Askalon. Annual report (Smithsonian Institution), 1922. Washington: G.P.O. OCLC 24016431.
- ——— (1929). The Hittite Empire: being a survey of the history, geography and monuments of Hittite Asia Minor and Syria. London: Constable and Company, Ltd. OCLC 16747179.
- ——— (1931). The Foundations of Bible History: Joshua, Judges. London: Constable & Co. OCLC 937776.
- ———; Spencer, Herbert (1934). The Heritage of Solomon: an historical introduction to the sociology of ancient Palestine. London: Williams and Nortgate. OCLC 3191377.
- ——— (20 September 1936). "Reprint from "Palestine in Peril". The Observer.
- ———; Garstang, John B. E. (1940). The Story of Jericho. London: Hodder & Stoughton. OCLC 314782750.
- ———; Garstang, Hetty (October 1947). "A Conspectus of Early Cilician Pottery". American Journal of Archaeology. LI (4): 370–388.
- ——— (1950). "Traveller's Quest". In Michael, M. A. (ed.). Original Contributions towards a Philosophy of Travel. William Hodge and Co. Ltd.
- ——— (1953). Prehistoric Mersin, Yümük Tepe in Southern Turkey: the Neilson Expedition in Cilicia. London: Oxford at the Clarendon Press. OCLC 1721677.
- ———; Gurney, O. R. (1959). The Geography of the Hittite Empire. Occasional publications of the British Institute of Archaeology at Ankara. Vol. 5. London: British Institute of Archaeology at Ankara. OCLC 404320.

== Primary sources ==
- The Garstang Museum of Archaeology, University of Liverpool, holds a large collection of John Garstang's archaeological and photographic records,1900-1936, including records from El-Mahasna; Bet Khallaf; Reqaqnah; Beni Hasan; Hierakonpolis; Hissayeh; Esna; Kostamneh; Dakka; Abydos; his survey of Hittite sites in Anatolia; Sakçagözü; Meroë; Jericho. (Reference Number: GB/3431/JG).
- University College, London Archives holds a collection of John Garstang's papers, including material relating to Beisan, Boğazkale, Hazor, and Jericho; albums and other material relating to Yümük Tepe near Mersin; rolled diagrams relating to Sakçagözü; plans relating to Ashkelon. (Reference No: UCLCA/IA/A/17).
- The Palestine Exploration Fund Archives hold Garstang's field notebooks, drawings, papers and photographs, 1930–1936, (Reference Number: PEF/JER/GAR).
- The Abbey House Museum hold Garstang's diaries and papers relating to Jericho, (Reference Number: JC).

== Further research ==
Many of Garstang's excavations were never fully published in his lifetime and have subsequently been published by other authors after his death:

- Downes, Dorothy (1974). The Excavations at Esna, 1905-1906. Aris & Phillips. ISBN 0856680060.
- Adams, Barbara (1987). The Fort Cemetery at Hierakonpolis. (Excavated by John Garstang). Studies in Egyptology. London: KPI. ISBN 0-7103-0275-4.
- Adams, Barbara (1995). Ancient Nekhen: Garstang in the City of Hierakonpolis. Egyptian Studies Association Publication. Vol. 3. New Malden: SIA Publishing. ISBN 1872561039.
- Török, László (1997). Meroe City: An Ancient African Capital: John Garstang's Excavations in the Sudan. London: Egypt Exploration Society. ISBN 0-85698-137-0.

== See also ==
- Plastered human skull
- Pro-Jerusalem Society - Garstang was a member of its leading Council per his role as Director of Antiquities
