= Jim Garstang =

American singer

- Genres: Christian

Jim Garstang was the American pianist for the Cathedral Quartet from 1972 through 1973. He also played piano briefly for the Dixie Echoes and Plainsmen quartets. He currently tours with both Leroy Van Dyke and Mel Tillis.
