= Garstang Museum of Archaeology =

University museum in Liverpool, UK

Garstang Museum and Research Centre
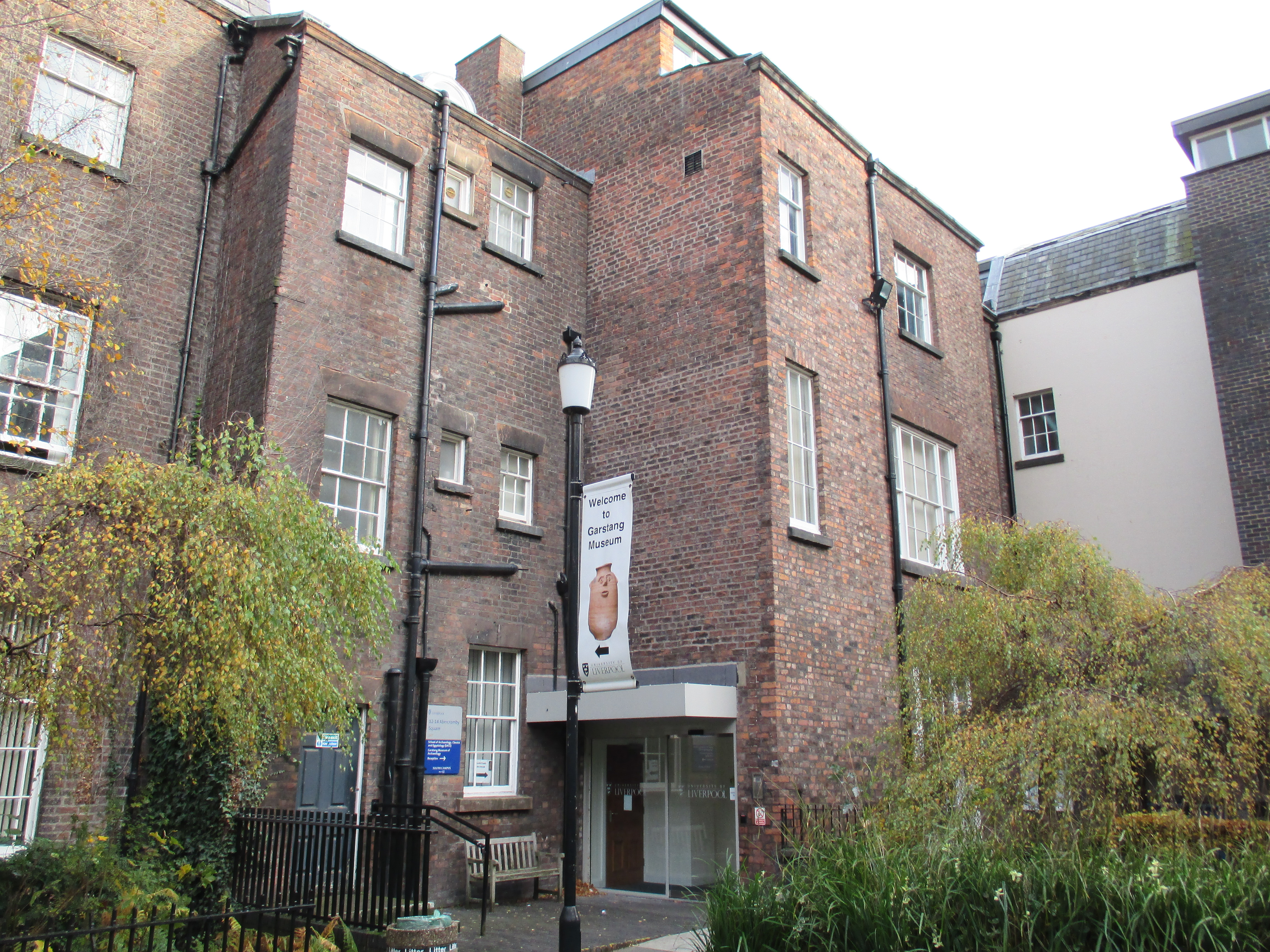
- Established: 1904
- Location: 14 Abercromby Square, University of Liverpool, Liverpool, L69 7WZ
- Coordinates: 53.4026°N 2.9644°W
- Website: www.liverpool.ac.uk/garstang-museum/

The Garstang Museum and Research Centre is a museum and research centre at the University of Liverpool. Its collections include artifacts from Egypt, Sudan, and the Near East.

== History ==
In 1904, the Liverpool Institute of Archaeology was founded by British archaeologist John Garstang and affiliated with the University of Liverpool. In 1948, the Institute of Archaeology was merged with the School of Oriental Studies, and officially became part of the university. In 2004, the School of Archaeology, Classics, and Egyptology Museum was renamed the Garstang Museum of Archaeology to celebrate the centenary of the foundation of the Institute.

== Gallery ==
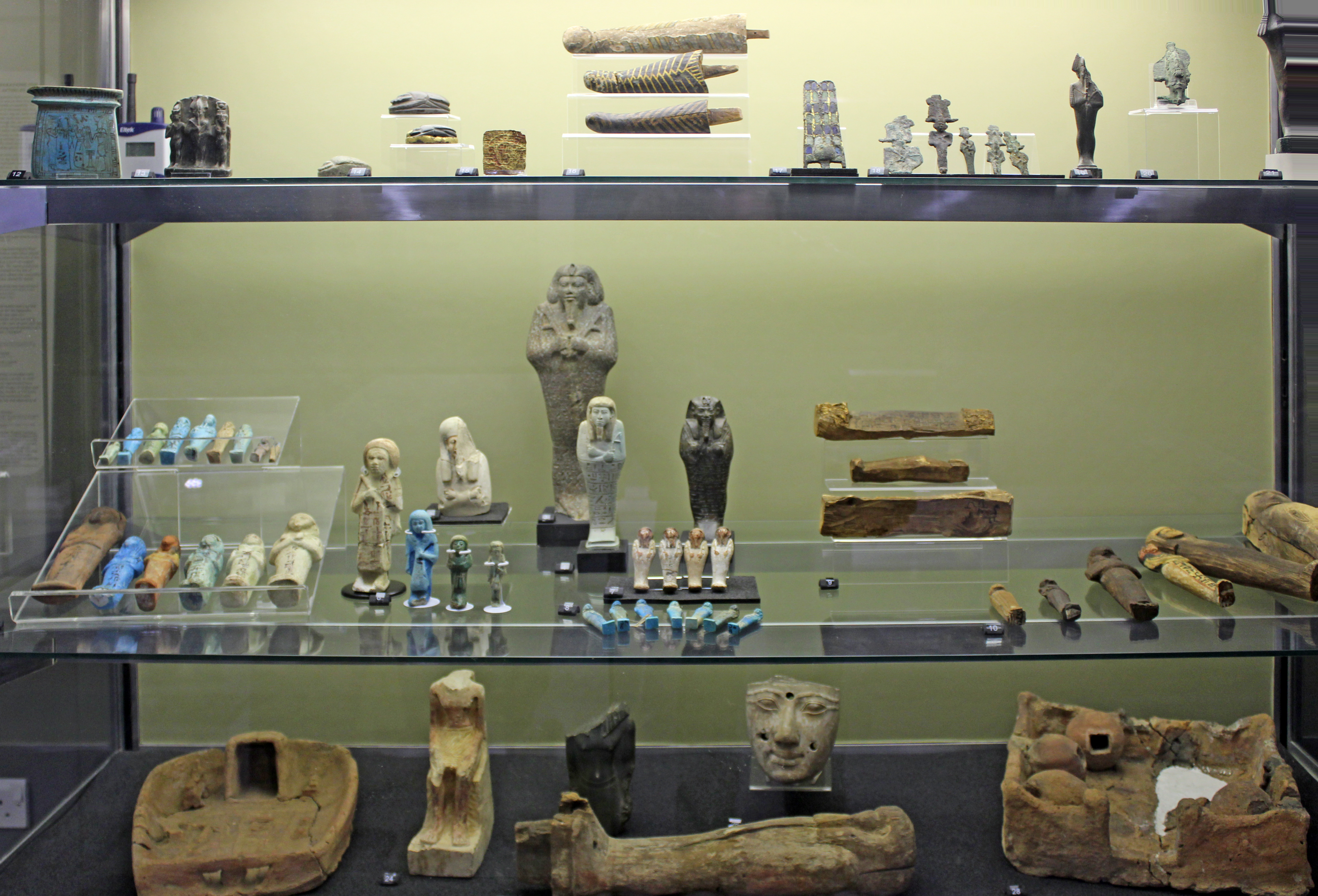
Field of Reeds display

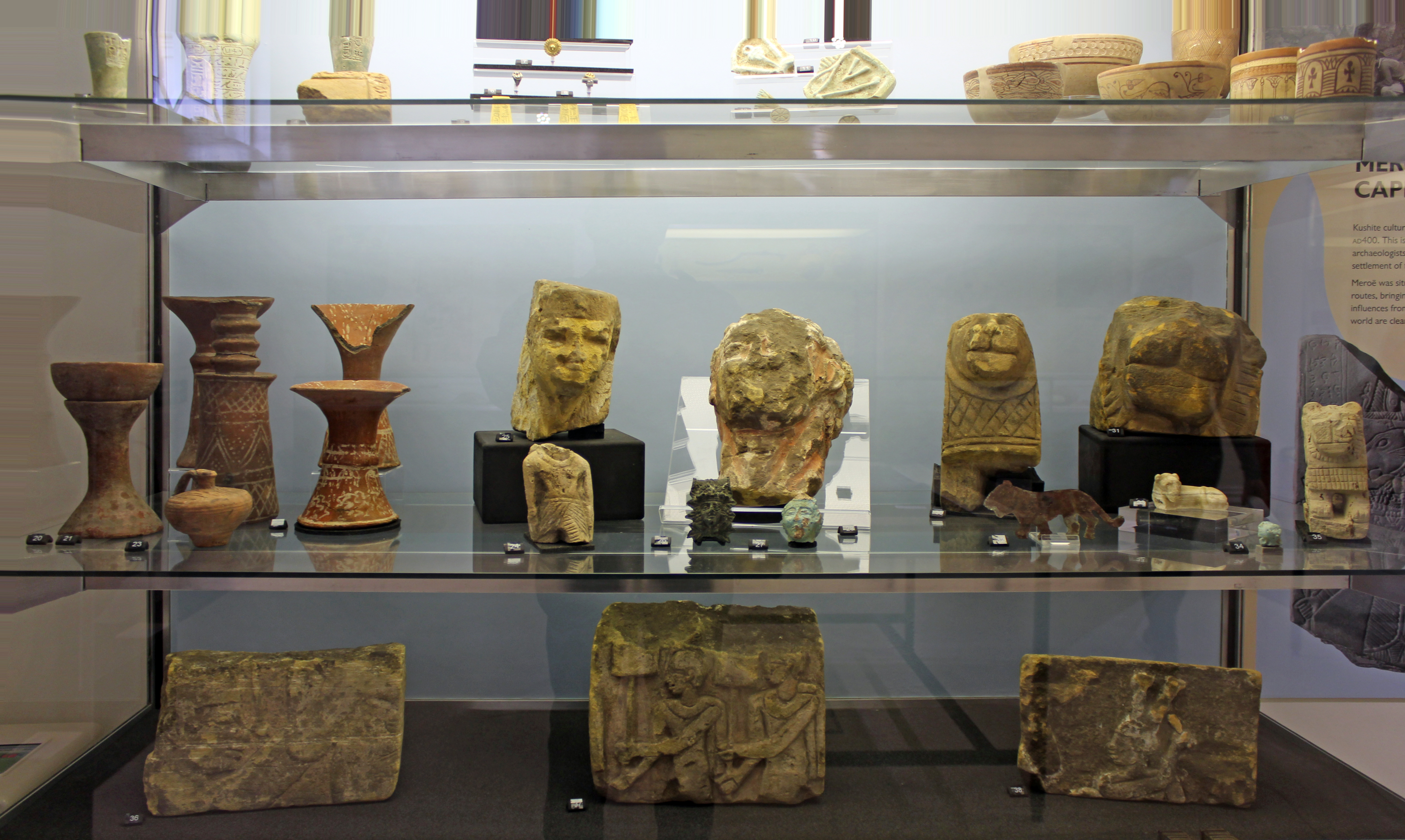
Meroë artifacts

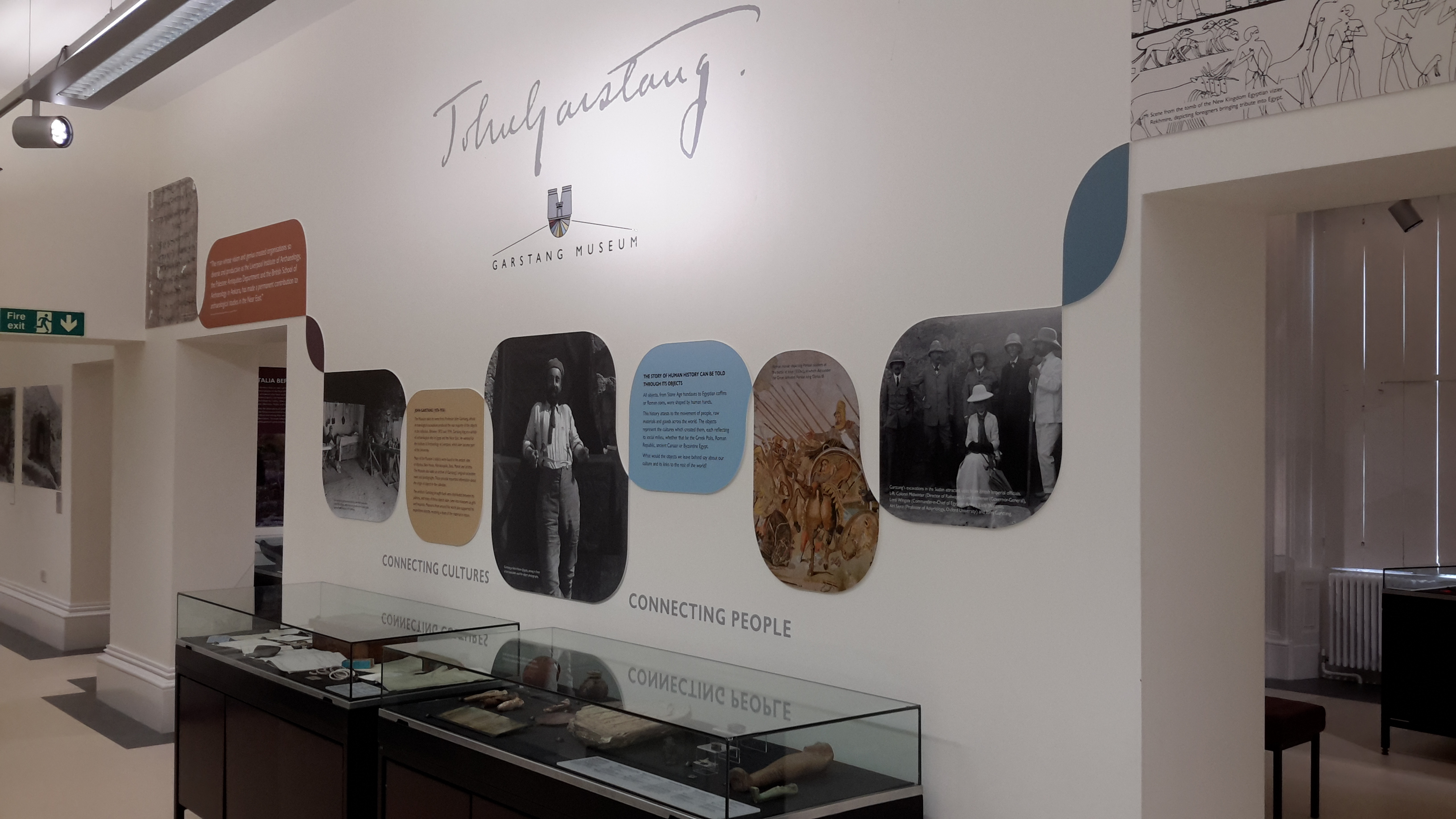
Gallery
