= David Before the Ark of the Covenant =

C, 1515 painting by Correggio

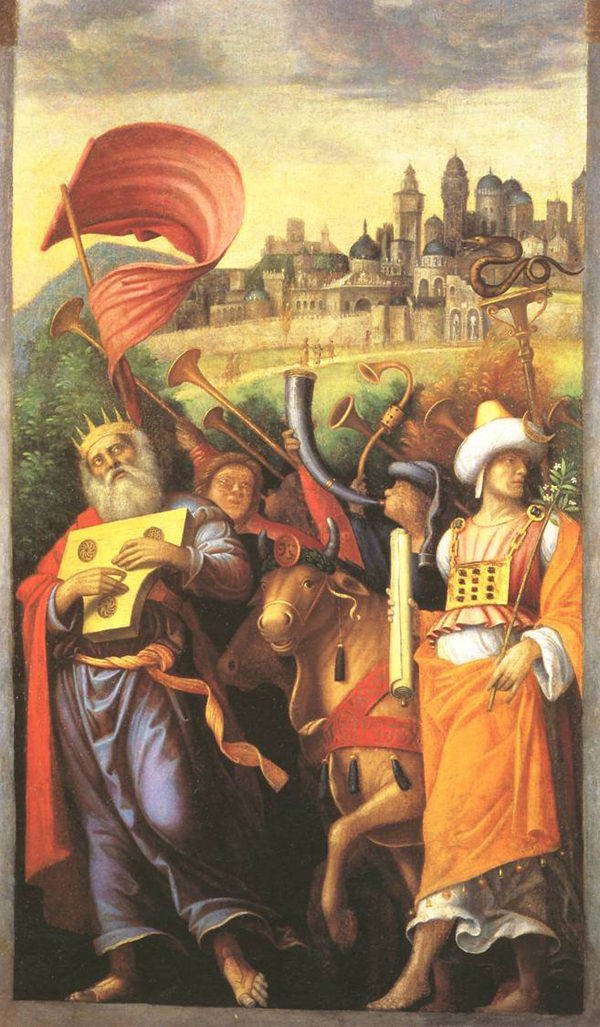

David Before the Ark of the Covenant is a c.1515 oil on canvas painting of King David by Correggio, rediscovered as a work by that artist by Giovanni Romano in 1996, an attribution accepted soon afterwards by David Ekserdjian. It is now in a private collection in Turin.

The work is thought to be one mentioned in abbot Luigi Lanzi's treatise on Andrea Mantegna's circle, “I giovani Mantegni”, in which he records a painter called "Carlo del Mantegna", working on Andrea Mantegna's funerary chapel and on "two history paintings of the Ark in the monastery of San Benedetto in Mantua, where we see Andrea's style again, albeit with less beautiful forms". Since Correggio is now known to have worked on the doors of the organ cover at San Benedetto Po in Mantua, it is theorised that the otherwise-unknown "Carlo del Mantegna" was actually a reference to a young Correggio.
