= The Holy Family and the Family of Saint John the Baptist =

Painting by Andrea Mantegna

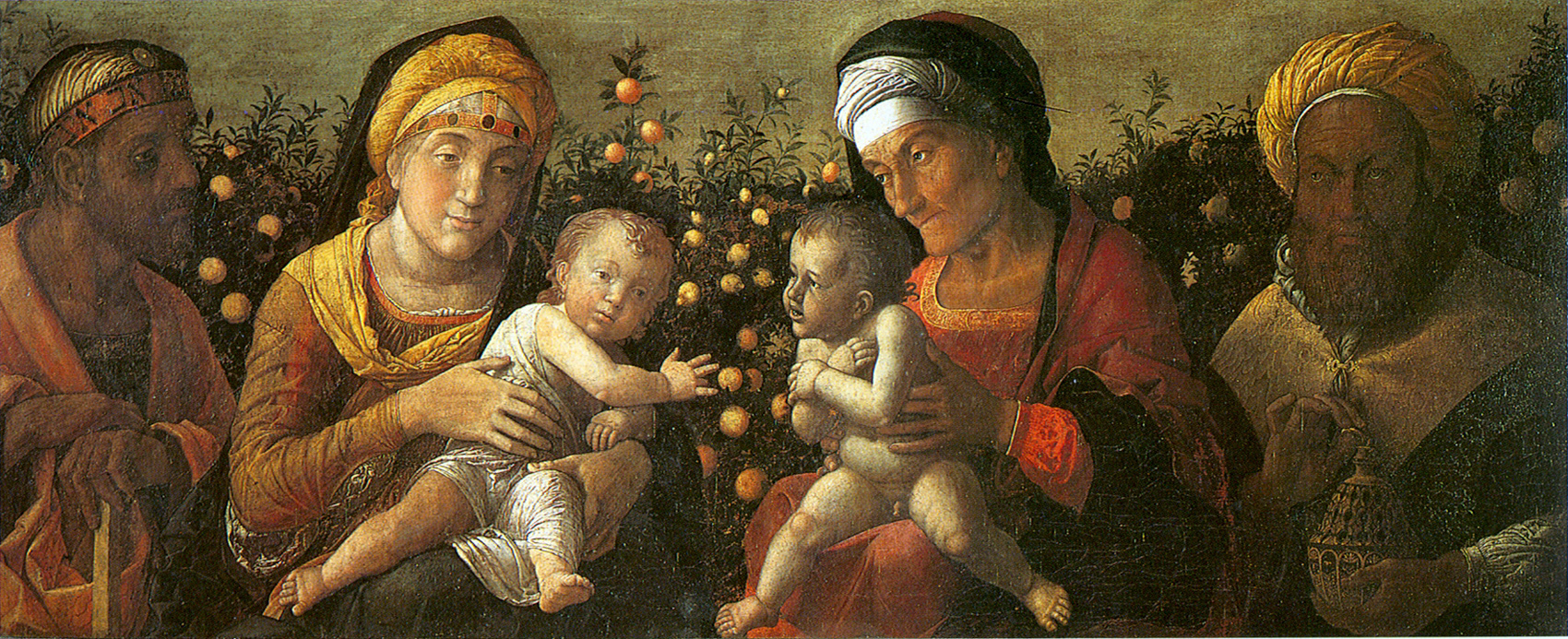
- Artist: Andrea Mantegna
- Year: 1504-1506
- Medium: casein tempera and gold on canvas
- Dimensions: 40 cm × 169 cm (16 in × 67 in)
- Location: Basilica of Sant'Andrea, Mantua

The Holy Family and the Family of Saint John the Baptist is a casein tempera on canvas painting with gilding, measuring 40 by 169 cm and dating to around 1504-1506. It was painted by Andrea Mantegna and was mentioned by his second son Francesco as still being in Andrea's studio on his death in 1506. According to Andrea's wishes, both it and Baptism of Christ were assigned to his funerary chapel in the Basilica of Sant'Andrea, Mantua, where they still hang. The choice of theme is linked to the chapel's dedication to John the Baptist.

On the left are Saint Joseph, the Virgin Mary and the Christ Child and on the right are the infant John the Baptist with his parents Saint Elizabeth and Saint Zacharias. Zacharias holds a strange ampulla, possibly a censor. In the background is a hedge bearing lemons, as also seen in the same artist's Trivulzio Madonna (1497).
