= Mantegna funerary chapel =

Chapel in Mantua, Lombardy, Italy

Coordinates: 45.1590°N 10.7946°E

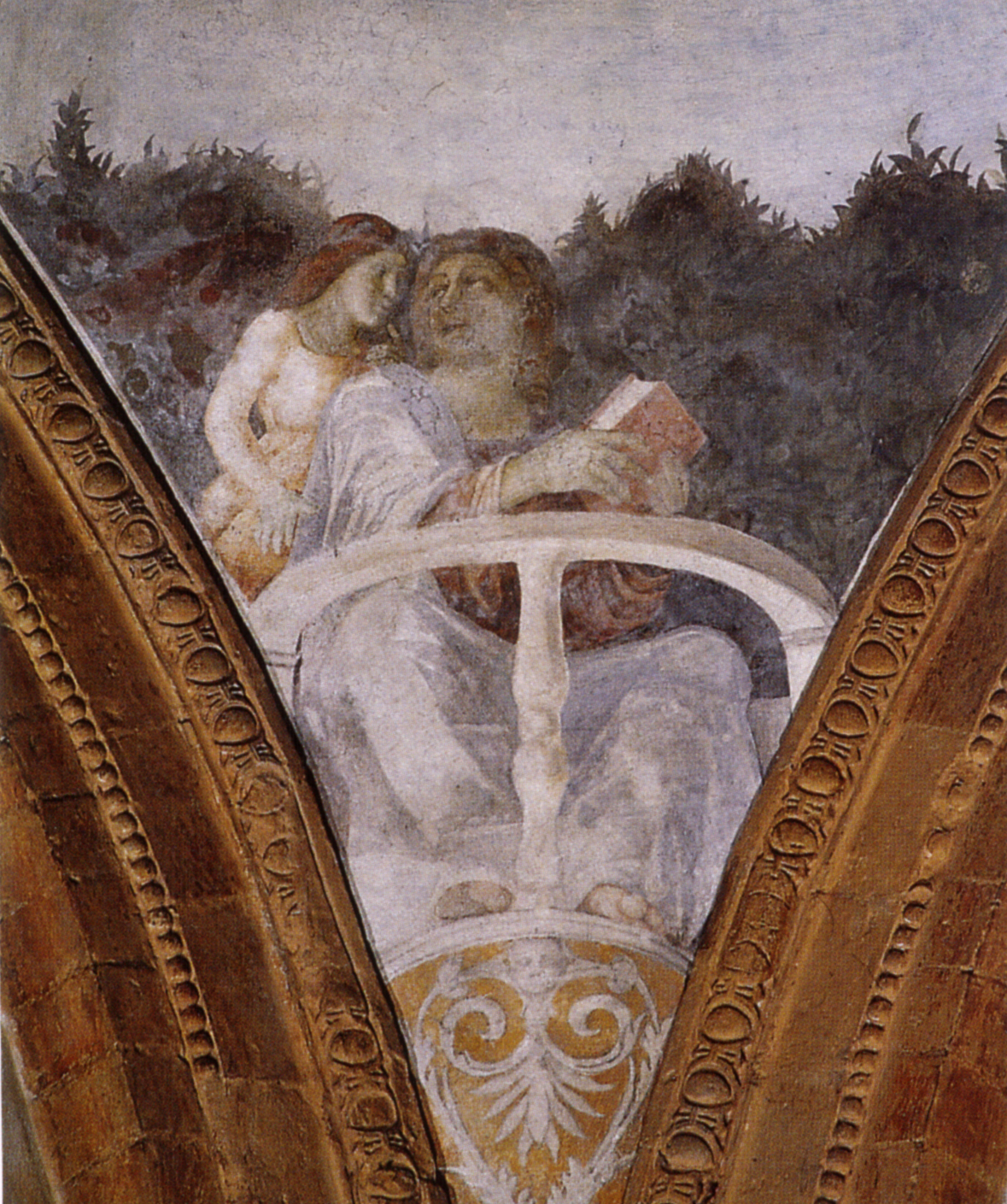
Correggio, Saint Matthew and the angel

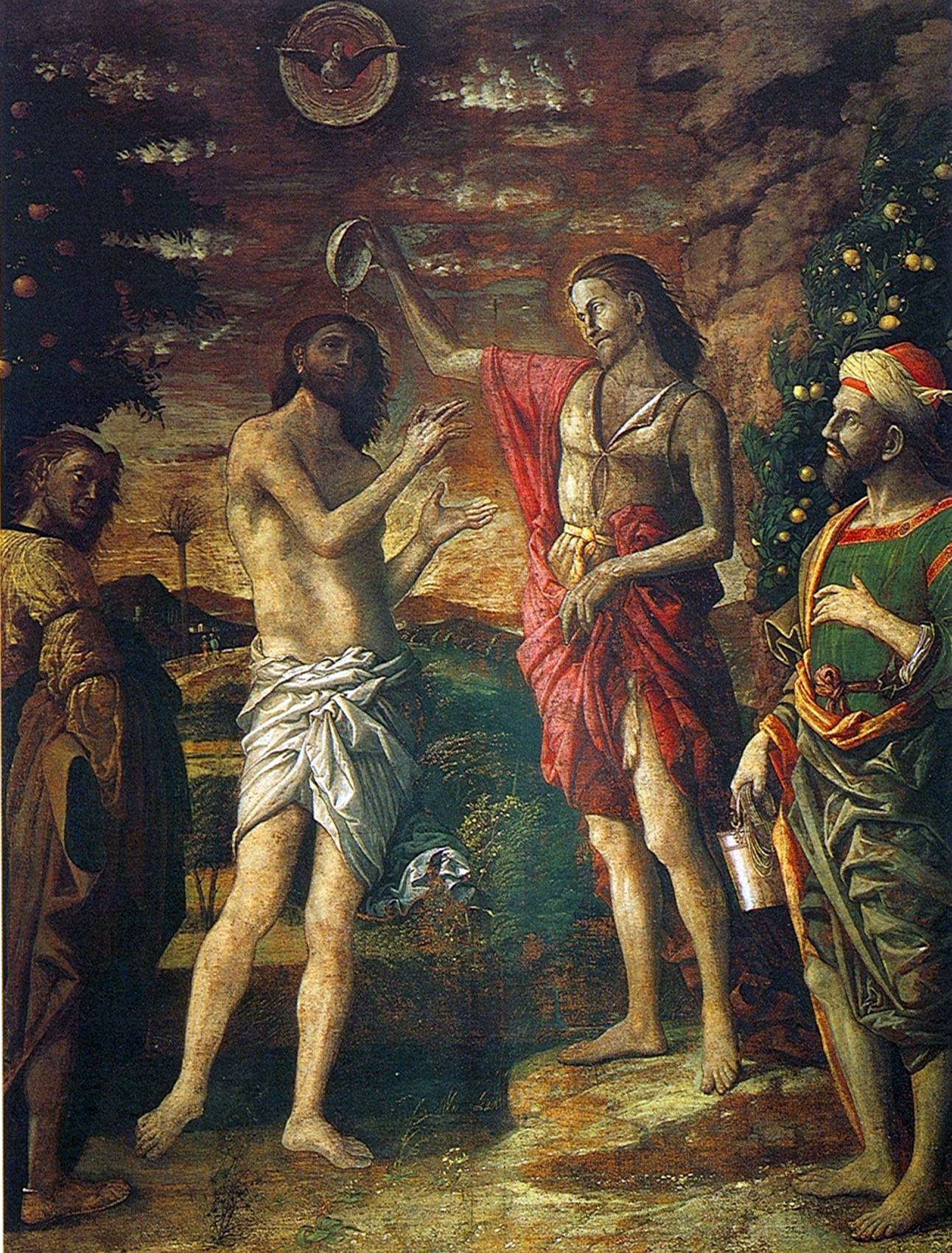
Mantegna and studio, Baptism of Christ

The Mantegna funerary chapel (Italian – cappella funeraria di Andrea Mantegna) is one of the chapels of the Basilica of Sant'Andrea, Mantua. It houses the tomb of the painter Mantegna and his last two paintings – Baptism of Christ (1506, on the high altar and probably completed by his son Francesco) and Holy Family with St John the Baptist, St Elizabeth and St Zacharias (1504–1506). Its frescoes from 1507 were painted by his sons Ludovico and Francesco and by a young Correggio. The tomb bears a bronze figure of Mantegna by Gianmarco Cavalli.

== History ==
Court painter to the Gonzagas for over 40 years, Mantegna's prestige meant he was granted a funerary chapel in the basilica which served their Marquisate of Mantua – this was the first side-chapel on the left beside Leon Battista Alberti's nave. Correggio was probably in Mantua at the time of Mantegna's death and probably came up with the overall scheme as well as doing much of the actual painting. In general the chapel was inspired by the plan for the chapel of pope Innocent VIII in the Belvedere in the Vatican, painted between 1488 and 1490 and destroyed in the 18th century. Historic descriptions record (among other things) its Stories of St John the Baptist and its trompe l'oeil marble fittings, vaulting, festoons, domes, putti and cherubs.

== Gallery ==
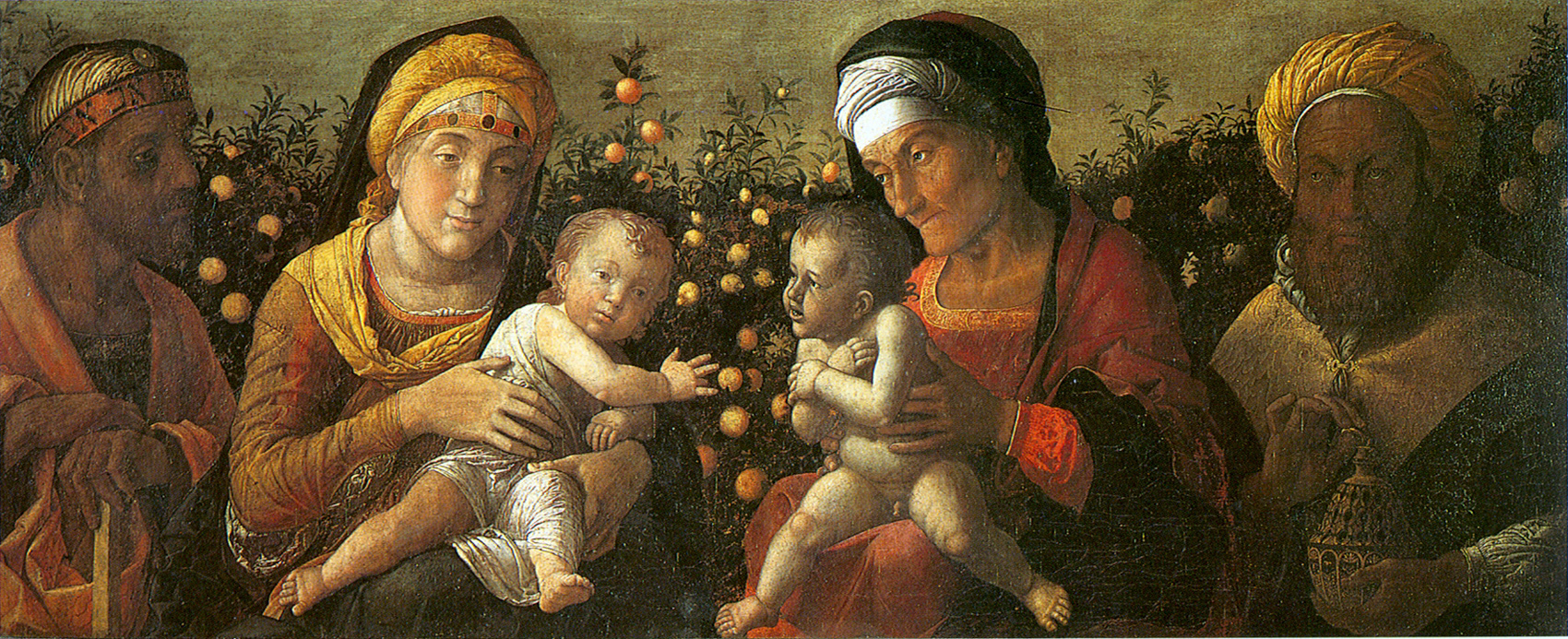
Mantegna, Holy Family with Saints John the Baptist, Elizabeth and Zacharias

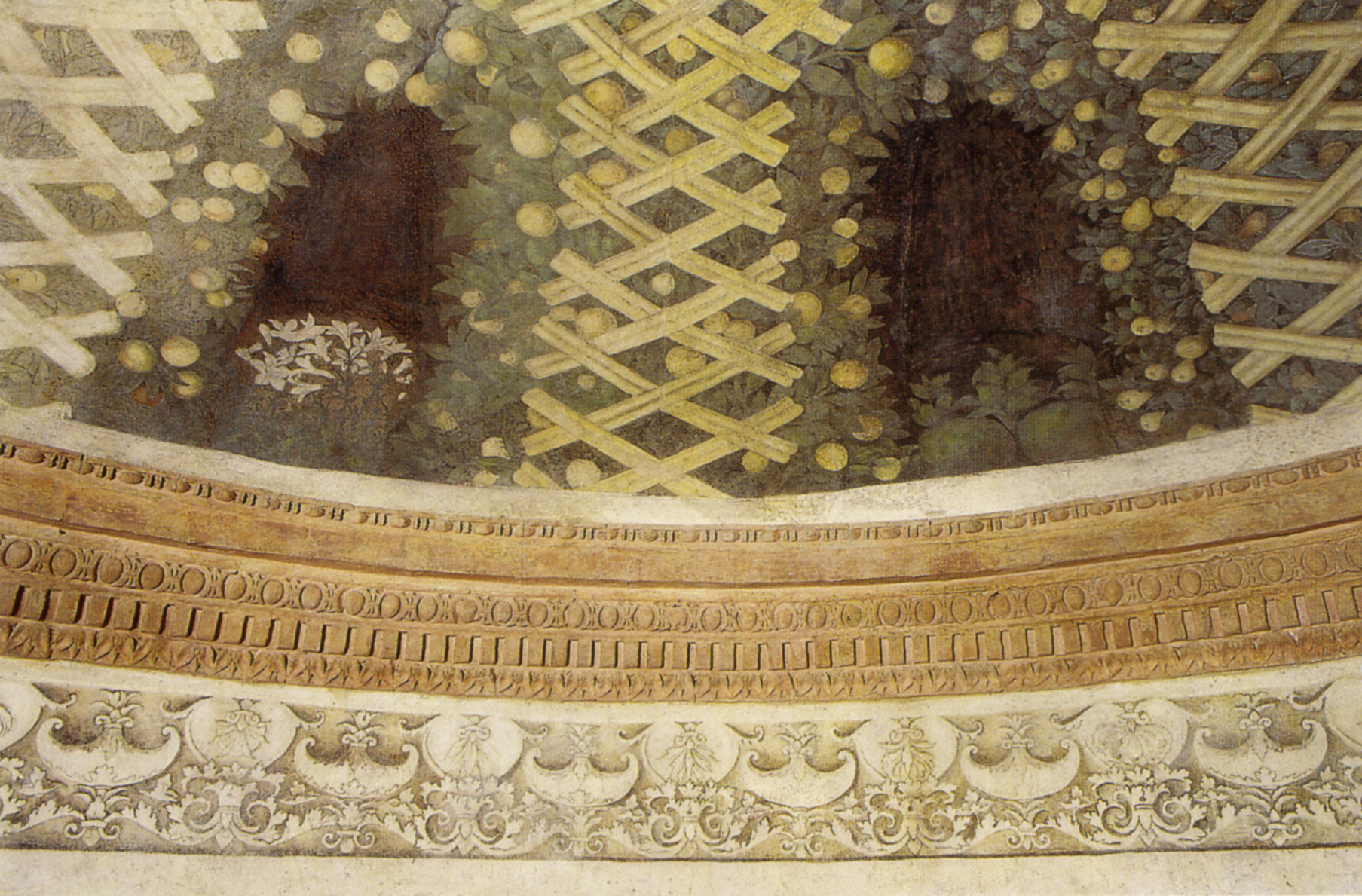
Base of the dome

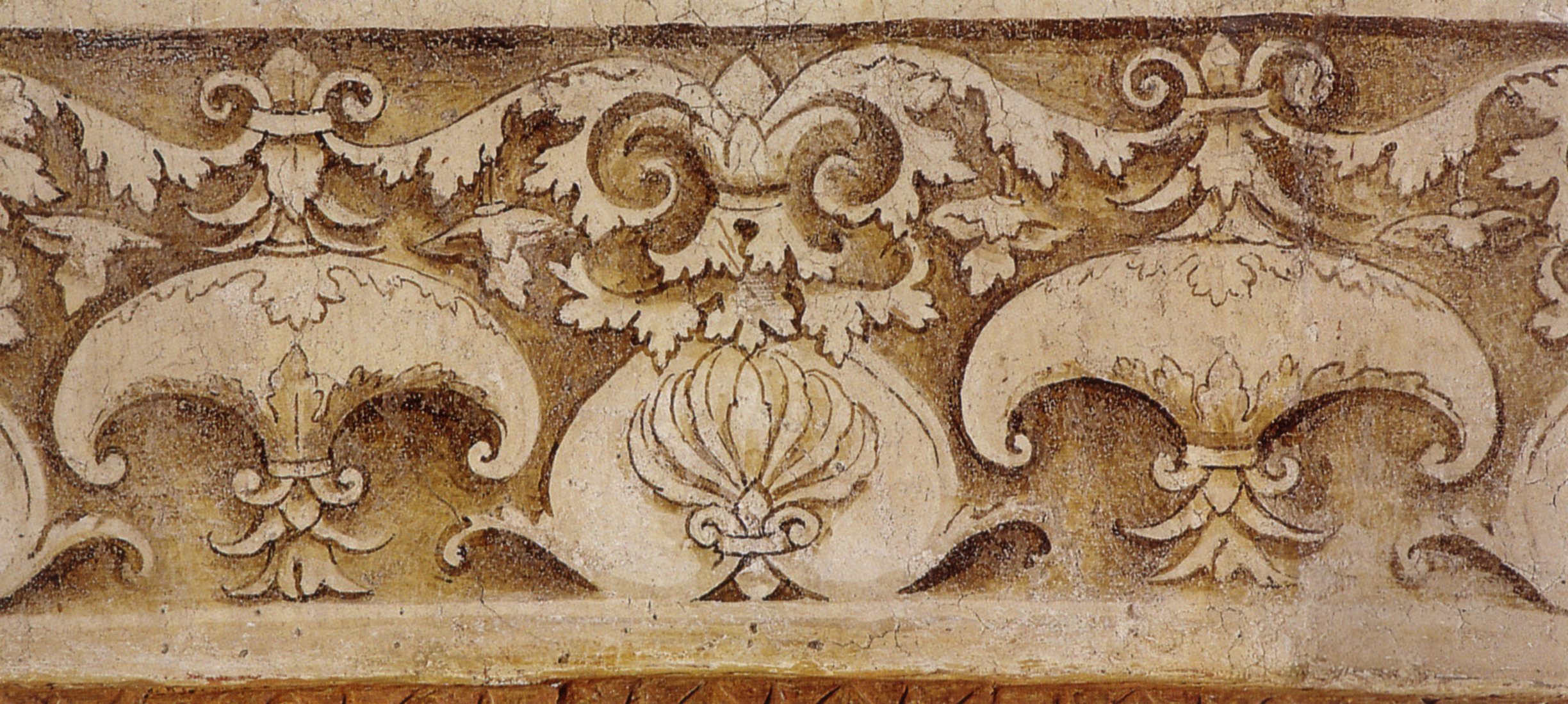
Detail of the fresco

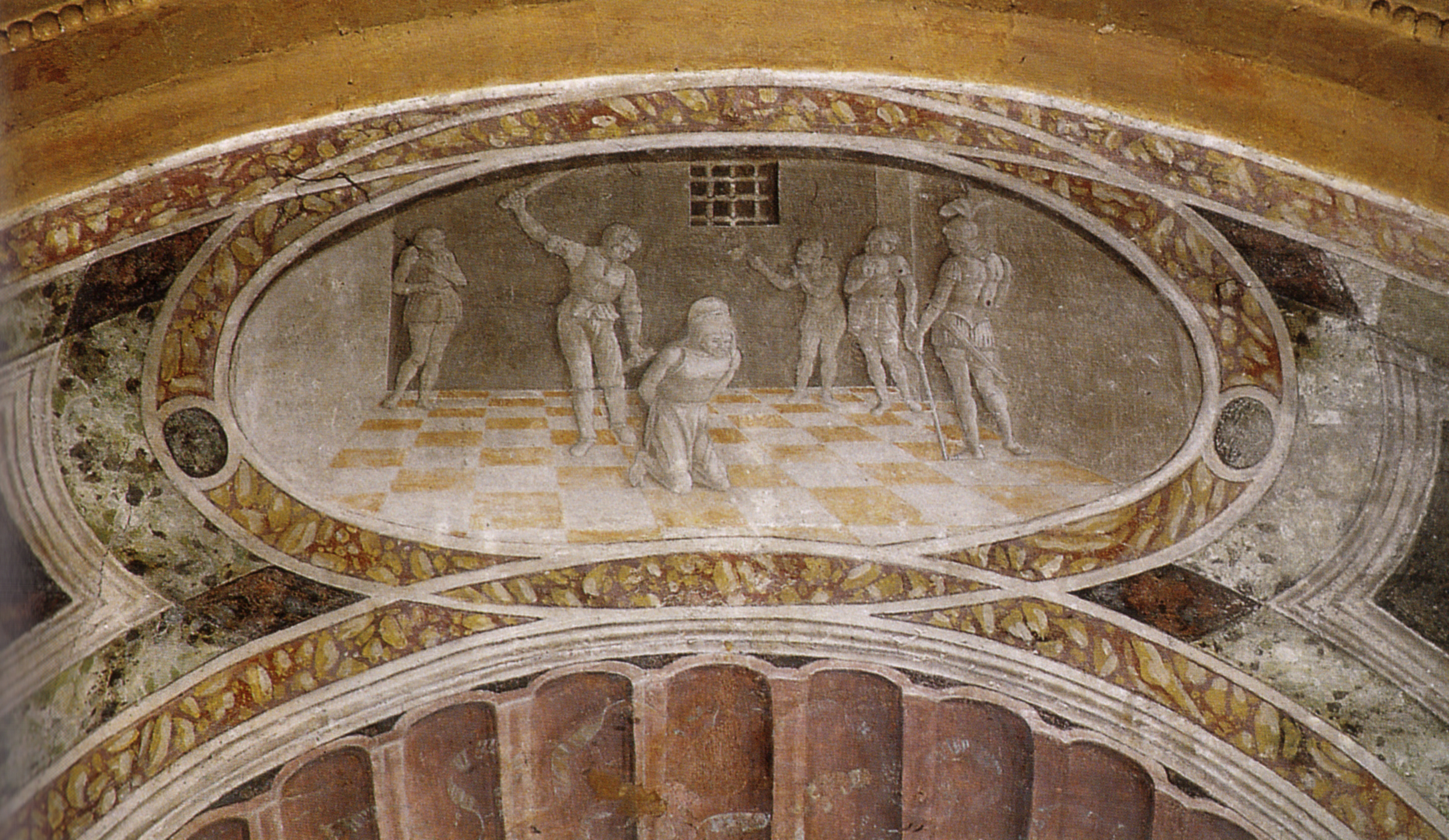
Correggio, grisaille showing Beheading of St John the Baptist

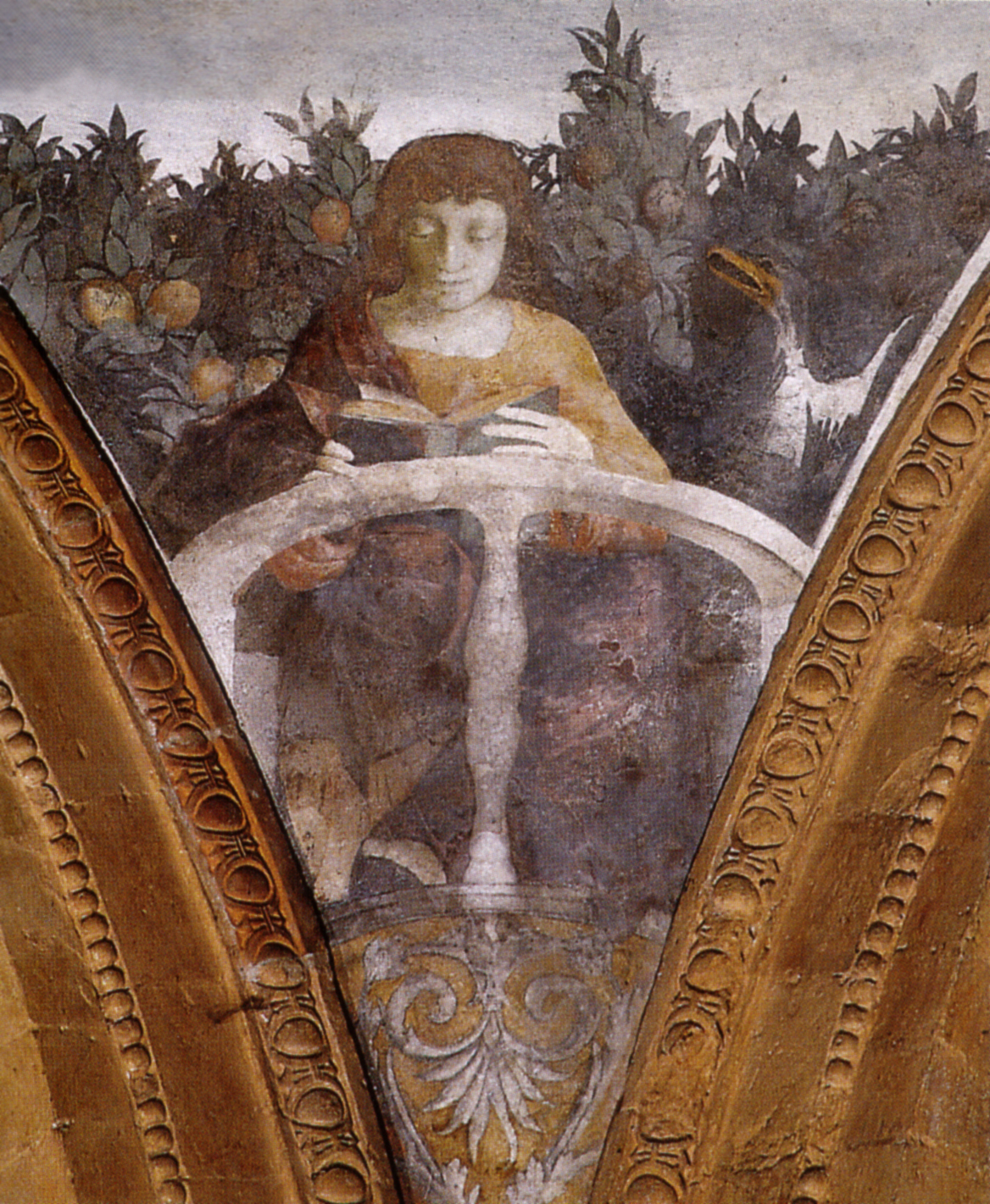
Correggio, St John the Evangelist with the eagle

== Bibliography ==
- (in Italian) Giuseppe Adani, Correggio pittore universale, Silvana Editoriale, Correggio 2007. ISBN 9788836609772
