= Giant order =

Architectural order

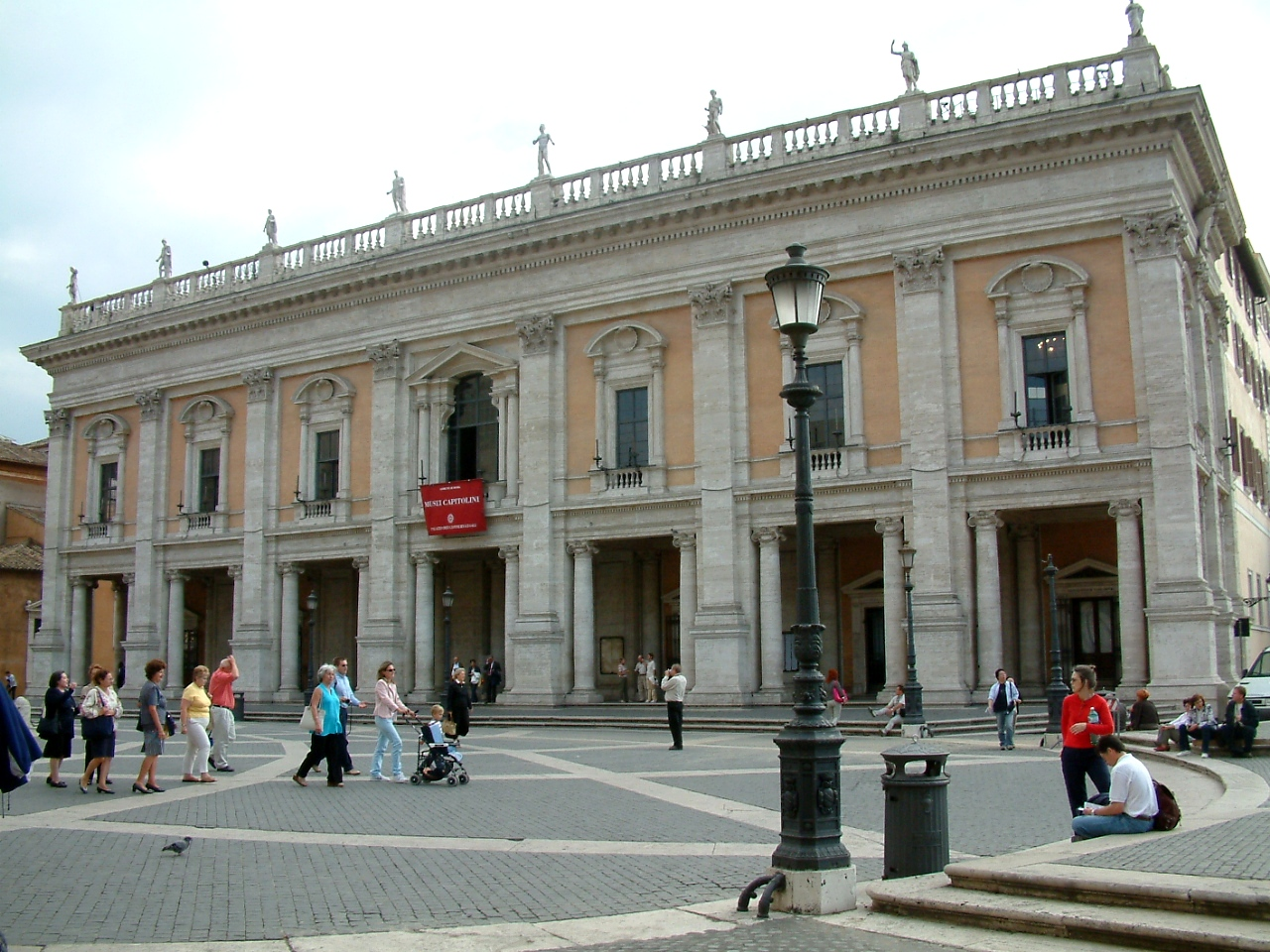
Michelangelo's Palazzo dei Conservatori in Rome

In classical architecture, a giant order, also known as colossal order, is an order whose columns or pilasters span two (or more) storeys. At the same time, smaller orders may feature in arcades or window and door framings within the storeys that are embraced by the giant order.

The giant order was rare in antiquity. Vitruvius's depiction of the lost Basilica of Fanum contains columns spanning two stories. Roman architectural historian Mark Wilson Jones also cites the columns at the Basilica of Pompeii, the Baths of Diocletian, and the Temple of Bacchus at Baalbek as early examples of the giant order. To an extent buildings with giant orders resemble a Roman temple adapted for post-classical use, as many were (the survivors have now usually been stripped of later filling-in).

== In Renaissance and Beaux-Arts architecture ==
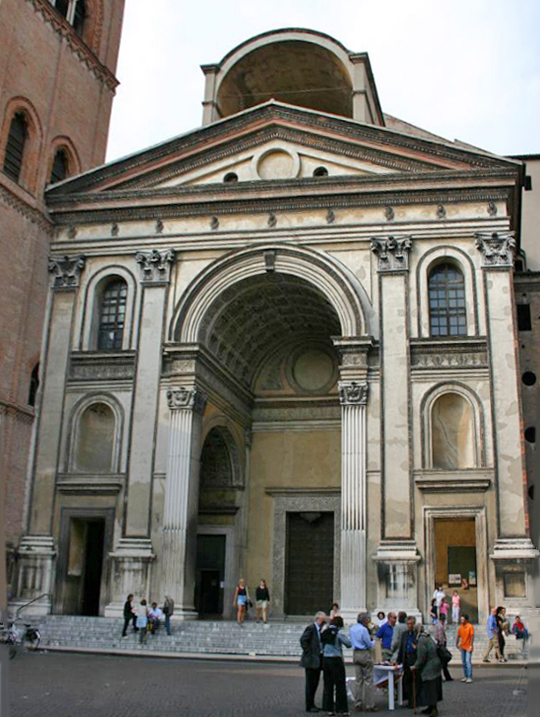
Facade of Sant'Andrea, Mantua

One of the earliest uses of this feature in the Renaissance was at the Basilica of Sant'Andrea, Mantua, designed by Leon Battista Alberti and begun in 1472; this adapted the Roman triumphal arch to a church facade. From designs by Raphael for his own palazzo in Rome on an island block it seems that all facades were to have a giant order of pilasters rising at least two stories to the full height of the piano nobile, "a grandiloquent feature unprecedented in private palace design". He appears to have made these in the two years before his death in 1520, which left the building unstarted. It was further developed by Michelangelo at the Palaces on the Capitoline Hill in Rome (1564–1568), where he combined giant pilasters of Corinthian order with small Ionic columns that framed the windows of the upper story and flanked the loggia openings below.

The giant order became a major feature of later 16th century Mannerist architecture, and Baroque architecture. Its use by Andrea Palladio justified its use in the seventeenth century in the movement known as neo-Palladian architecture.

It continued to be used in Beaux-Arts architecture of 1880–1920 as, for example, in New York City's James A. Farley Building, which claims the largest giant order Corinthian colonnade in the world.

== Gallery ==
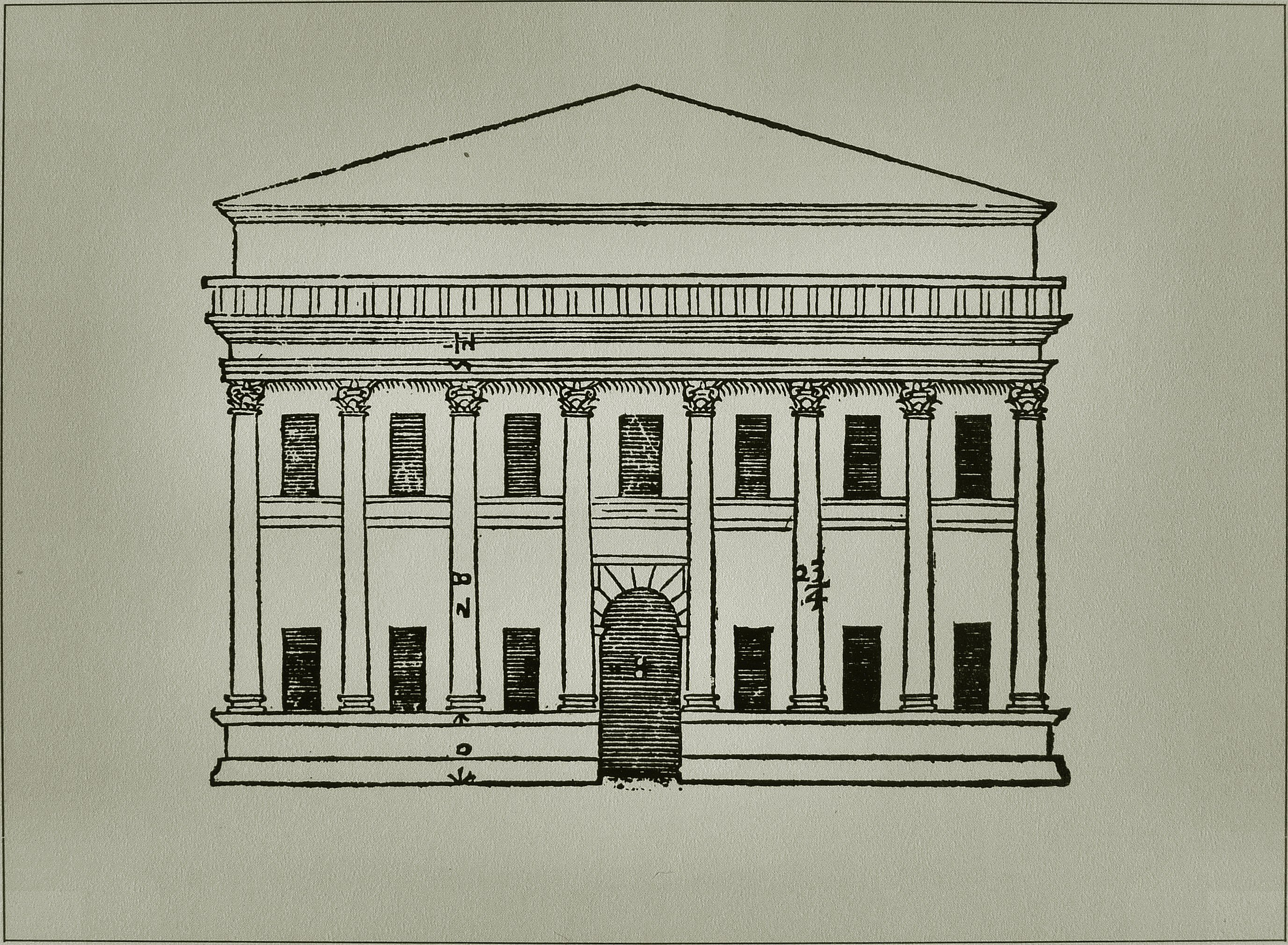
Front facade of the Palazzo Barbaran da Porto with Giant order, from I quattro libri dell'architettura (1570)

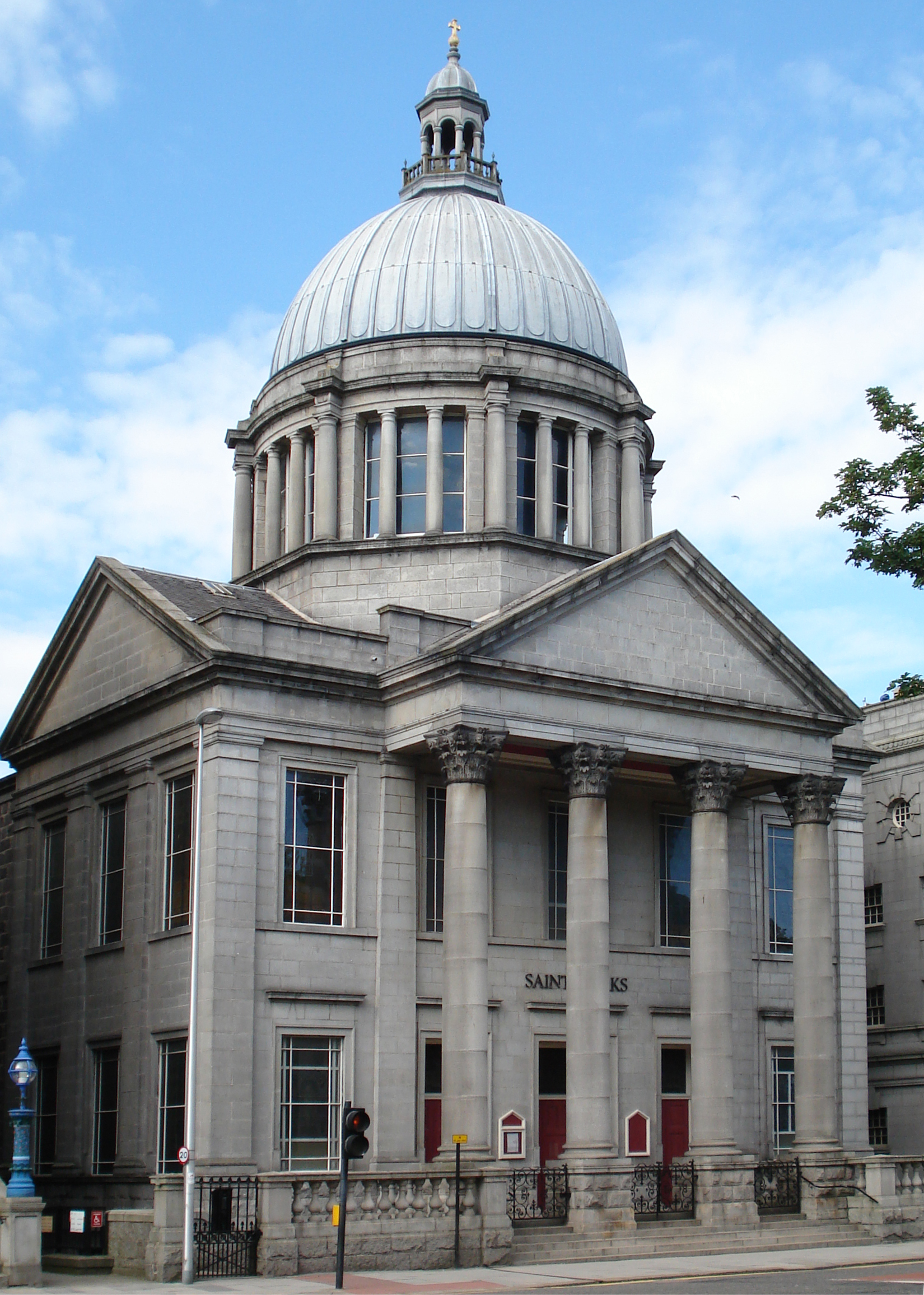
St Mark's Church in Aberdeen

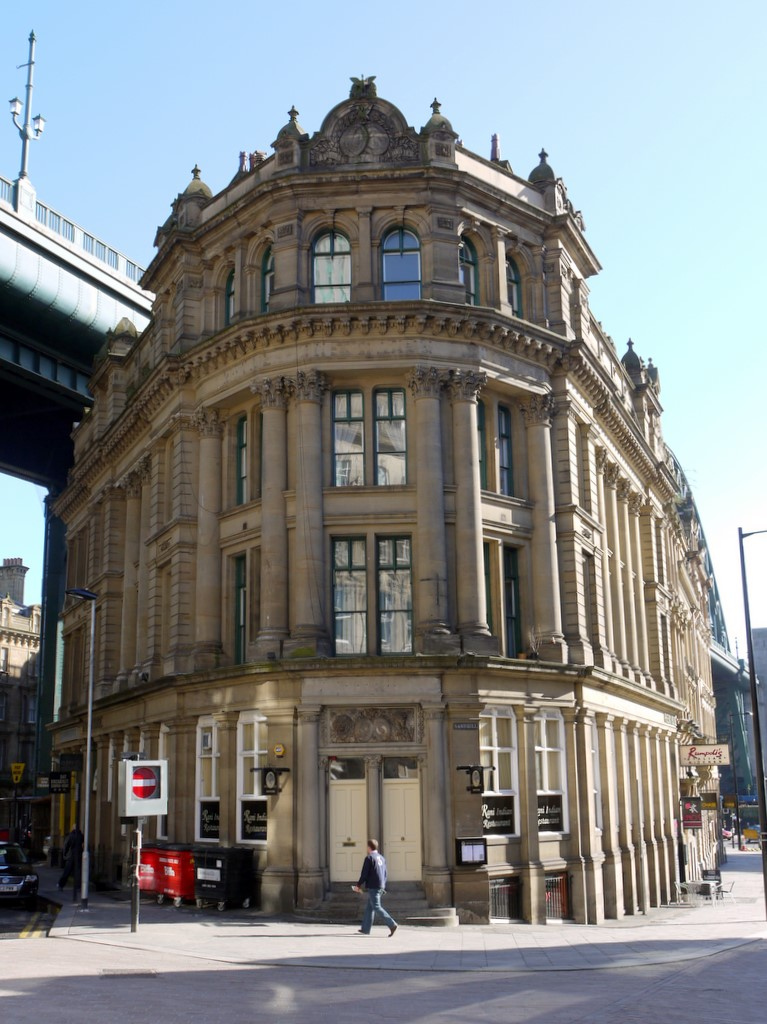
Giant coupled columns. Phoenix House, Sandhill, Newcastle upon Tyne

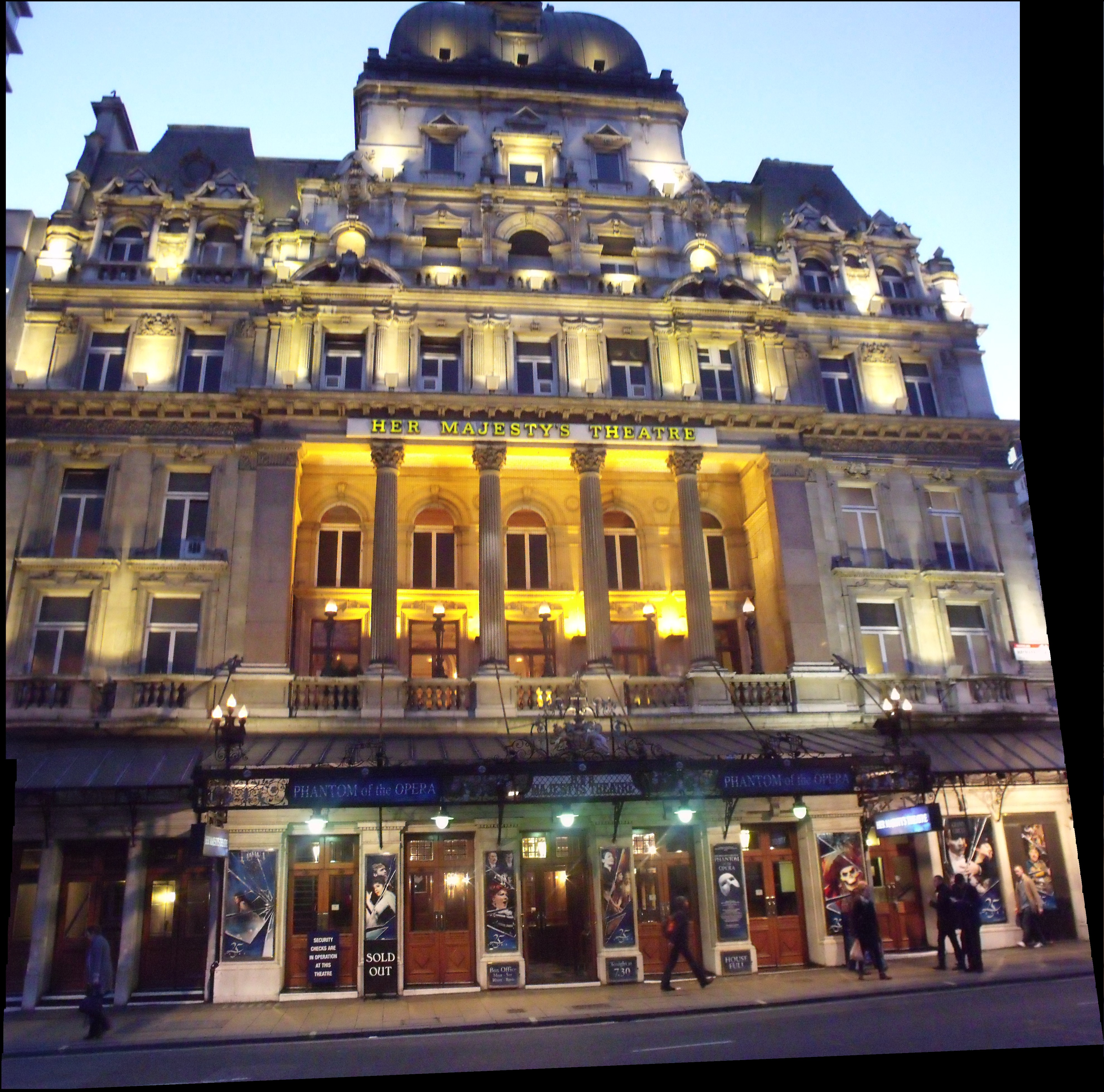
Her Majesty's Theatre in Haymarket, London

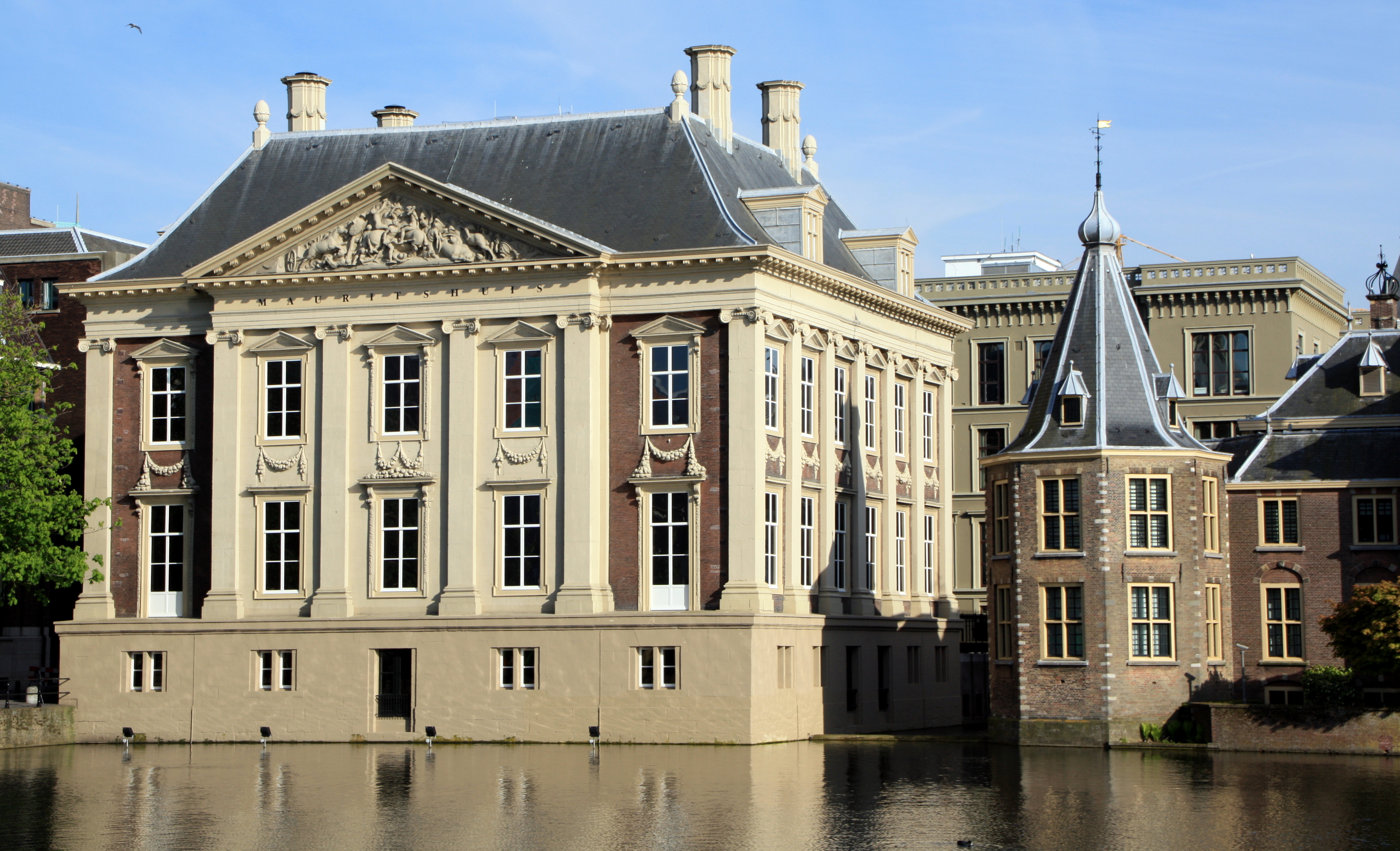
Mauritshuis, in The Hague, The Netherlands

Romanesque example of a giant arcade encompassing two floors of the elevation, Romsey Abbey, England, 12th century
