= Baptism of Christ (Mantegna) =

Painting by Andrea Mantegna

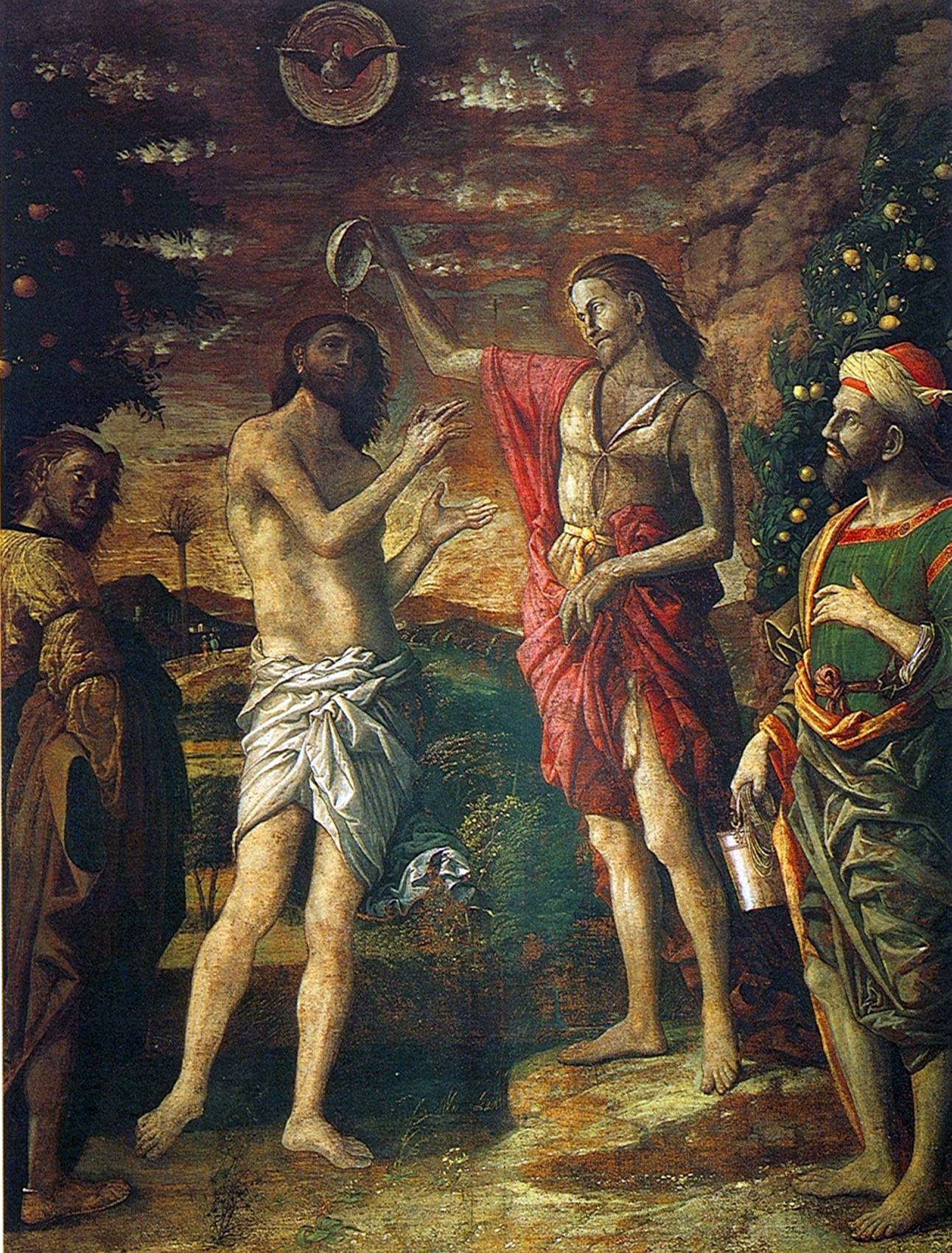
- Artist: Andrea Mantegna and studio
- Completion date: 1506
- Medium: casein tempera and gold on canvas
- Dimensions: 230 cm × 176 cm (91 in × 69 in)
- Location: Mantua

The Baptism of Christ is a casein tempera and gold on canvas painting measuring 176 cm x 230 cm and dating to around 1506. It and The Holy Family and the Family of Saint John the Baptist were painted by Andrea Mantegna for his funerary chapel at the Basilica of Sant'Andrea, Mantua - the chapel was dedicated to John the Baptist, hence the choice of subjects. They were both found in his studio after his death by his son Francesco and placed in the chapel, where they still hang.

Baptism is incomplete and was probably worked up by Francesco, a less-skilled artist - the colour on the mantle of the unknown character on the right may be his work. Above is the Holy Spirit descending as a dove, whilst a figure to the left is probably an angel holding Christ's garments. The central background is hilly, whilst the looming rock to the right is similar to that in Triumph of Virtue (1499–1502). The orange tree to the right and the lemon tree to the left recall the background of the Trivulzio Madonna (1497).
