= Basilica of Sant'Andrea, Mantua =

Roman Catholic cathedral in Lombardy, Italy

Basilica di Sant'Andrea
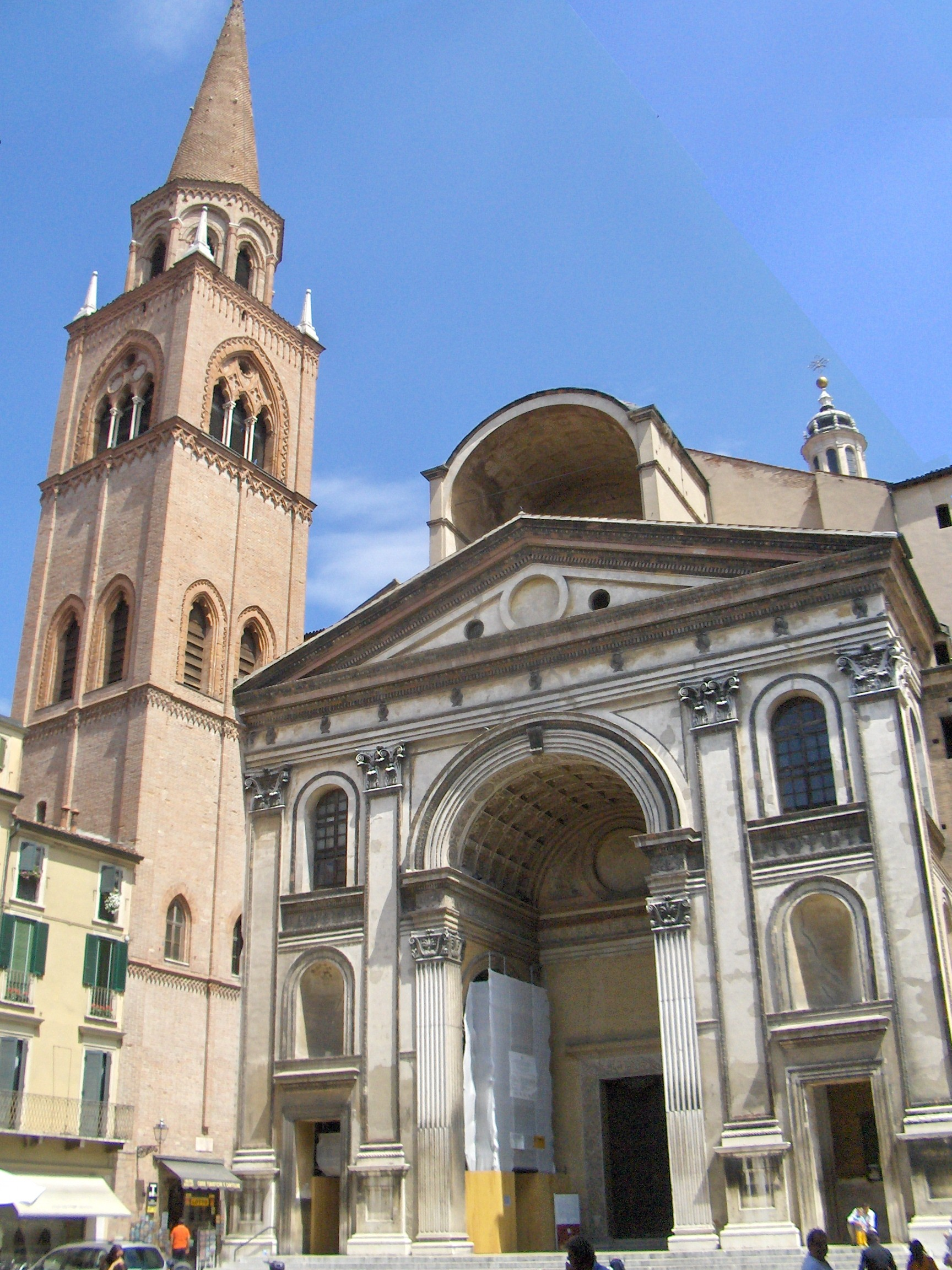
- Façade and belltower

Religion
- Affiliation: Roman Catholic
- Ecclesiastical or organisational status: Minor basilica, co-cathedral

Location
- Location: Mantua, Italy
- Interactive map of Basilica di Sant'Andrea
- Coordinates: 45°9′32″N 10°47′39″E

Architecture
- Architect: Leon Battista Alberti
- Type: Church
- Style: Renaissance
- Groundbreaking: 1472
- Completed: 1790

Website
- www.diocesidimantova.it

The Basilica of Sant'Andrea is a Roman Catholic co-cathedral and minor basilica in Mantua, Lombardy (Italy). It is one of the major works of 15th-century Renaissance architecture in Northern Italy. Commissioned by Ludovico III Gonzaga, the church was begun in 1472 according to designs by Leon Battista Alberti on a site occupied by a Benedictine monastery, of which the bell tower (1414) remains. The building, however, was only finished 328 years later. Though later changes and expansions altered Alberti's design, the church is still considered to be one of Alberti's most complete works. It looms over the Piazza Mantegna.

== Architecture ==
The façade, built abutting a pre-existing bell tower (1414), is based on the scheme of the ancient Arch of Trajan at Ancona. It is largely a brick structure with hardened stucco used for the surface. It is defined by a large central arch, flanked by Corinthian pilasters. There are smaller openings to the right and left of the arch. A novel aspect of the design was the integration of a lower order, comprising the fluted Corinthian columns, with a giant order, comprising the taller, unfluted pilasters. The whole is surmounted by a pediment and above that a vaulted structure, the purpose of which is not exactly known, but presumably to shade the window opening into the church behind it.

An important aspect of Alberti's design was the correspondence between the façade and the interior elevations, both elaborations of the triumphal arch motif, the arcades, like the façade, having alternating high arches and much lower square topped openings.

The nave is roofed by a barrel vault, one of the first times such a form was used on such a monumental scale since antiquity, and probably modeled on the Basilica of Maxentius in Rome. Alberti possibly planned for the vault to be coffered, much like the shorter barrel vault of the entrance, but lack of funds led to the vault being constructed as a simple barrel vault with the coffers then being painted on. Originally, the building was planned without a transept, and possibly even without a dome. This phase of construction more or less ended in 1494.

In 1597, the lateral arms were added and the crypt finished. The massive dome (1732–1782) was designed by Filippo Juvarra, and the final decorations were added to the interior under Paolo Pozzo and others in the late 18th and early 19th centuries.

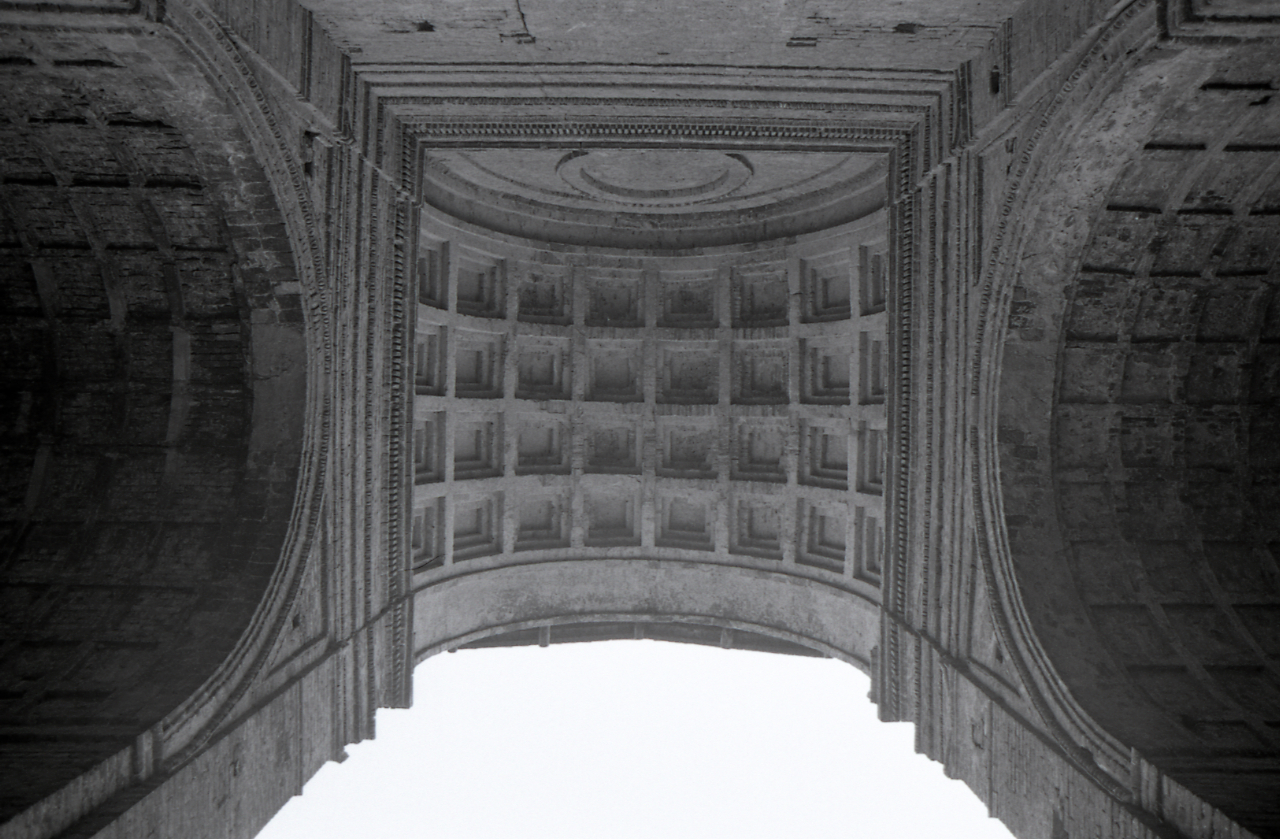
Elements of the arches on the lateral façade. Photo by Paolo Monti

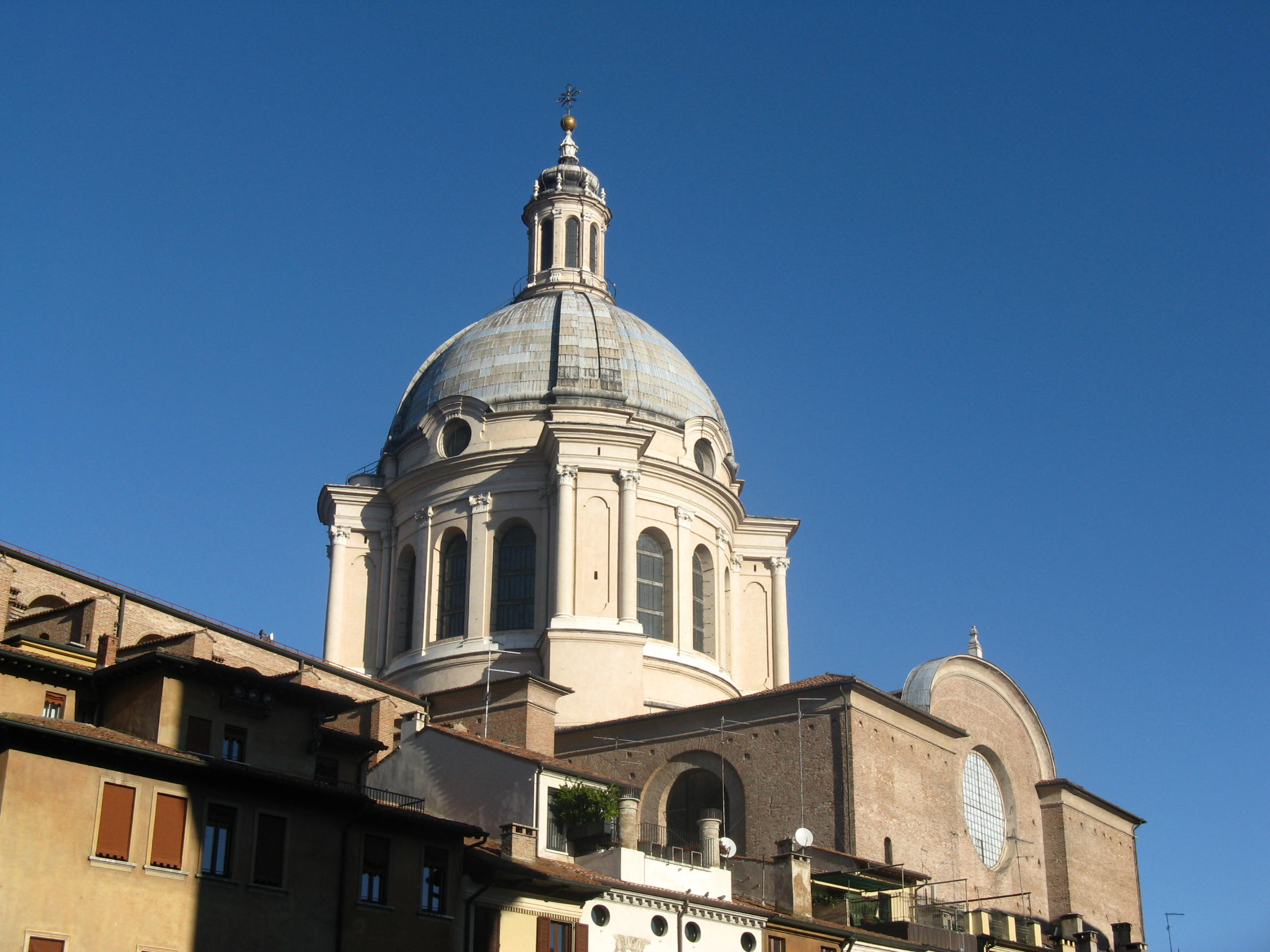
Dome

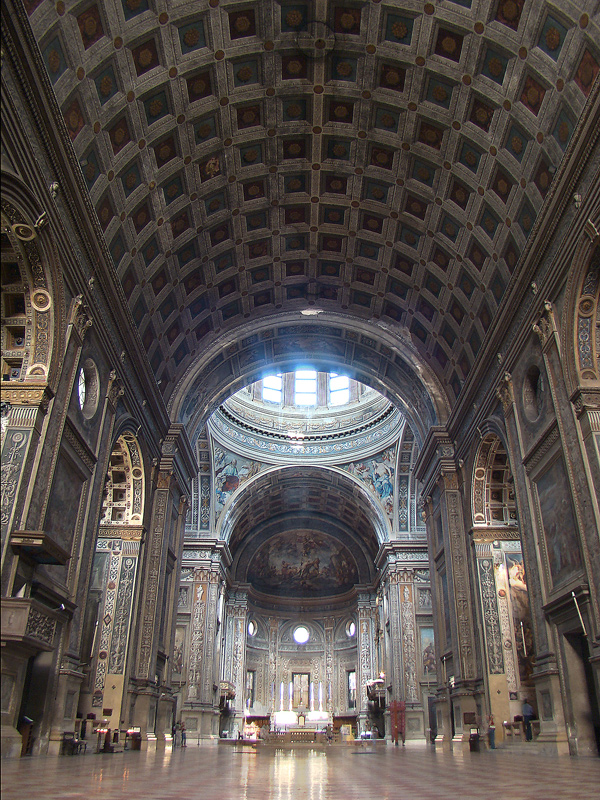
Interior

== Relic of the Holy Blood ==
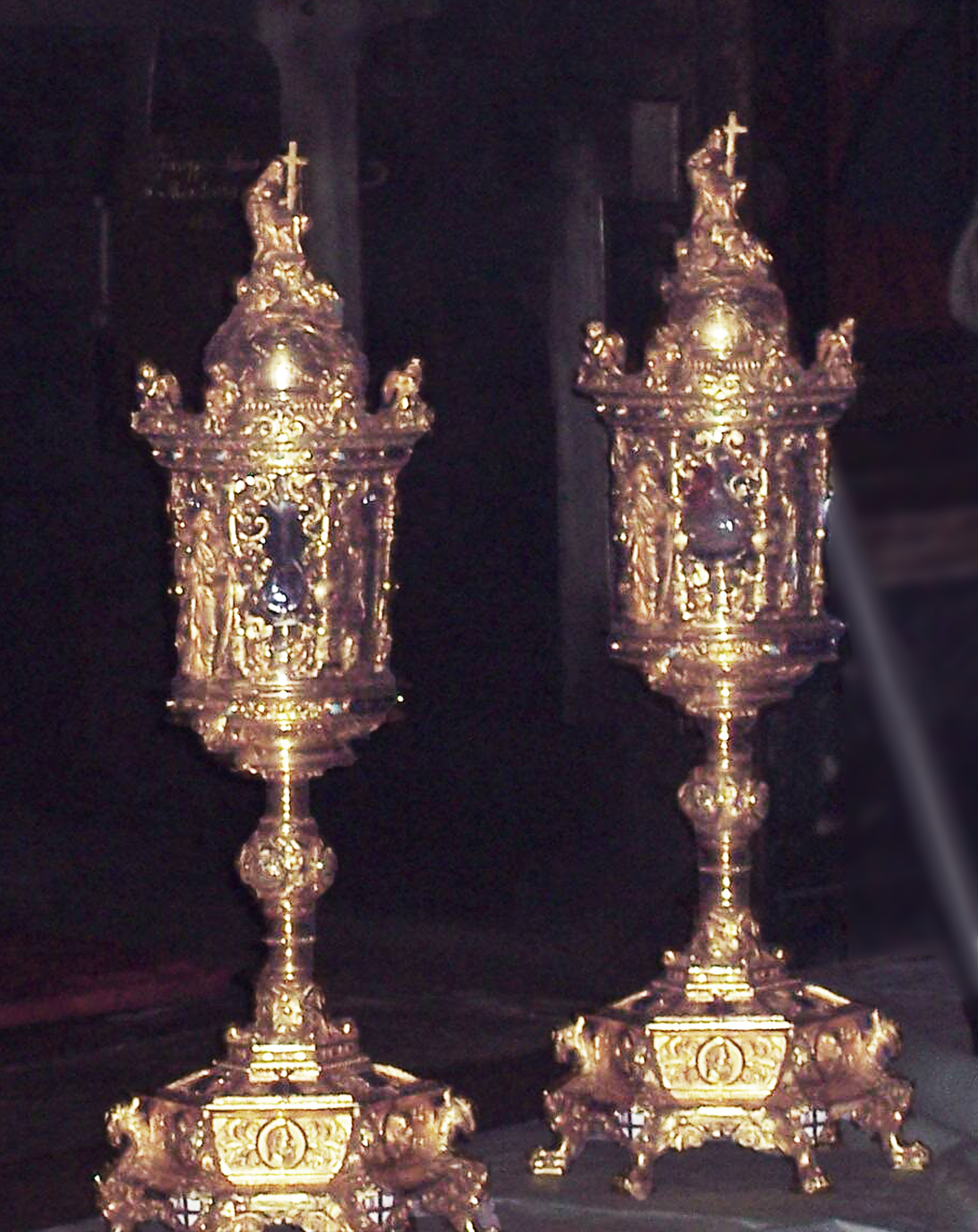
The Sacred Vessels containing the relic of the Blood of Christ

The purpose of the new building was to receive the pilgrims for the feast of Ascension when a vial, that the faithful believe contains the Blood of Christ, is brought up from the crypt below through a hole in the floor located directly under the dome. The relic, called Preziosissimo Sangue di Cristo ("Most Precious Blood of Christ"), which is preserved in Sacred Vessels. According to tradition the blood was brought to the city by the Roman centurion Longinus, who had scooped up the earth containing the blood at the foot of the cross.

In 804 Holy Roman emperor Charlemagne obtained authentication of the relic from Pope Leo III for its veneration. According to many scholars, this resulted in the creation of the Diocese of Mantua and the construction of first portion of the Cathedral of St Andrew. The relic was "rediscovered" (secunda inventio) ca. 1049, in the presence of Matilda of Tuscany. Pope Leo IX recognized this relic as authentic in 1053, which became highly venerated during the Renaissance. The relic is displayed on Good Friday, to the faithful, and in a procession on the city's streets.

Portions of the relic were extracted and taken by Charlemagne to the St Chapelle in Paris, and later to the Weingarten Abbey, to the Archbasilica of St. John Lateran in Rome, and to the Church of the Holy Cross in Guastalla (built on behalf of Beatrix of Canossa).

== Other aspects ==
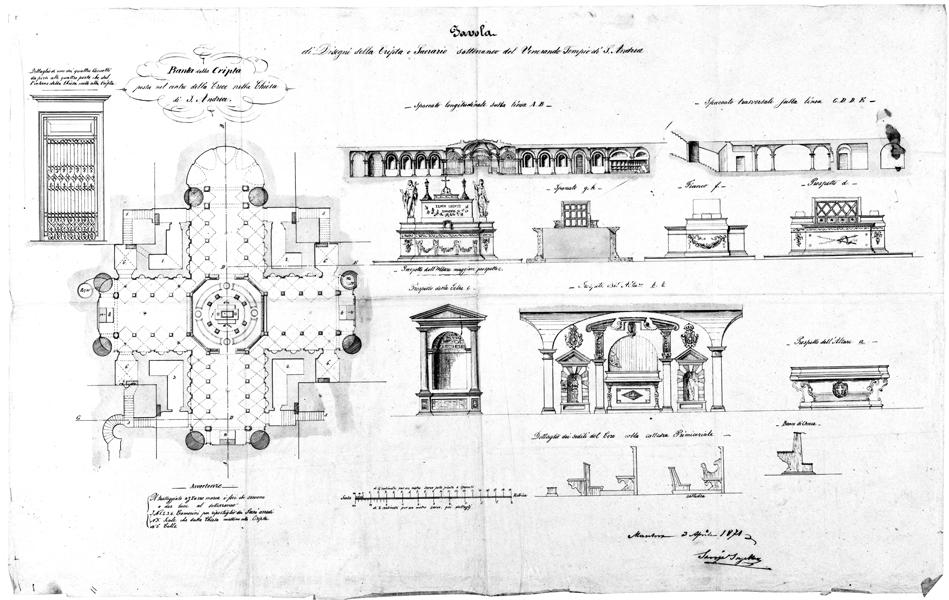
Plan and drawings of the crypt

Alberti broke with basilican tradition by having multiple chapels branch off the nave instead of lining it with aisles—because the colonnades would block the view of ceremonies in the classic model. One of the chapels is known as the Mantegna funerary chapel, since it houses the tomb of the early Renaissance painter Andrea Mantegna, with a bronze figure of him by Gianmarco Cavalli and Mantegna's own Holy Family. Other artworks in the chapels include frescoes of Giulio Romano's school (a work by Giulio is currently a copy) and Correggio. In the belltower there are five bells (A, C#, E, F#, A) cast in the 19th century.

== Burials ==
- Federico I Gonzaga, Marquess of Mantua

== See also ==
- List of tallest domes
- Blood of Christ
- 18th-century Western domes
