= Pilaster =

Decorative architectural element giving the appearance of a supporting column

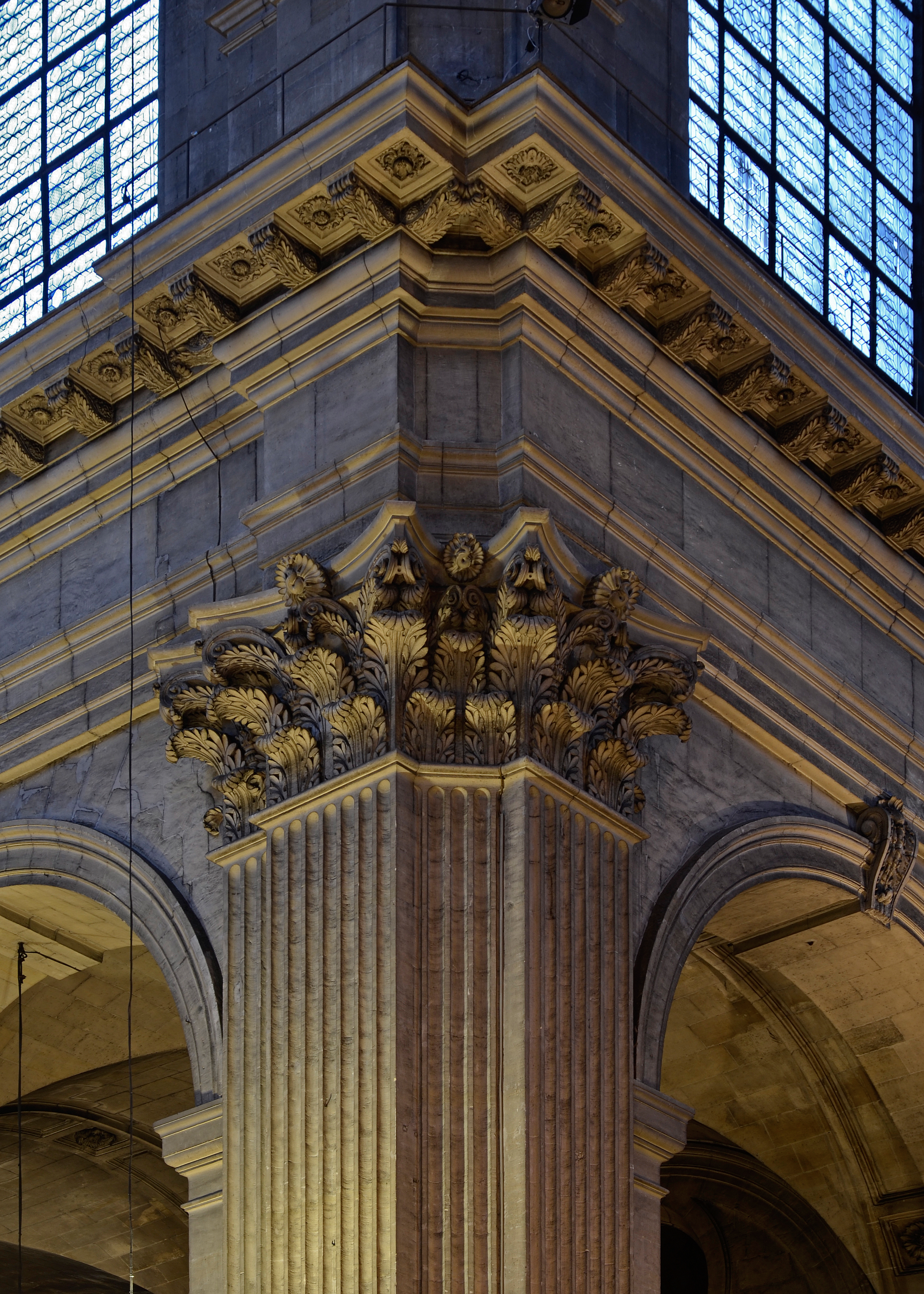
Two decorative Corinthian pilasters on a column in the Church of Saint-Sulpice (Paris)

In architecture, a pilaster is both a load-bearing section of thickened wall or column integrated into a wall, and a purely decorative element in classical architecture which gives the appearance of a supporting column and articulates an extent of wall. As an ornament it consists of a flat surface raised from the main wall surface, usually treated as though it were a column, with a capital at the top, plinth (base) at the bottom, and the various other column elements. In contrast to a Classical pilaster, an engaged column or buttress can support the structure of a wall and roof above.

== Definition ==
A pilaster is either a load-bearing architectural element used widely throughout the world where a structural load is carried by a thickened section of wall or column integrated into a wall, or a purely ornamental element used in Classical architecture.

As an ornament it may be defined as a flattened column which has lost its three-dimensional and tactile value.

=== In Classical architecture ===
In discussing Leon Battista Alberti's use of pilasters, which Alberti reintroduced into wall-architecture, Rudolf Wittkower wrote: "The pilaster is the logical transformation of the column for the decoration of a wall."

A pilaster appears with a capital and entablature, also in "low-relief" or flattened against the wall. Generally, a pilaster often repeats all parts and proportions of an order column; however, unlike it, a pilaster is usually devoid of entasis.

Pilasters often appear on the sides of a door frame or window opening on the facade of a building, and are sometimes paired with columns or pillars set directly in front of them at some distance away from the wall, which support a roof structure above, such as a portico. These vertical elements can also be used to support a recessed archivolt around a doorway. The pilaster can be replaced by ornamental brackets supporting the entablature or a balcony over a doorway.

When a pilaster appears at the corner intersection of two walls it is known as a canton.

As with a column, a pilaster can have a plain or fluted surface to its profile and can be represented in the mode of numerous architectural styles. During the Renaissance and Baroque architects used a range of pilaster forms. In the giant order pilasters appear as two storeys tall, linking floors in a single unit.

The fashion of using this decorative element from ancient Greek and Roman architecture was adopted in the Italian Renaissance, gained wide popularity with Greek Revival architecture, and continues to be seen in some modern architecture.

== Gallery ==
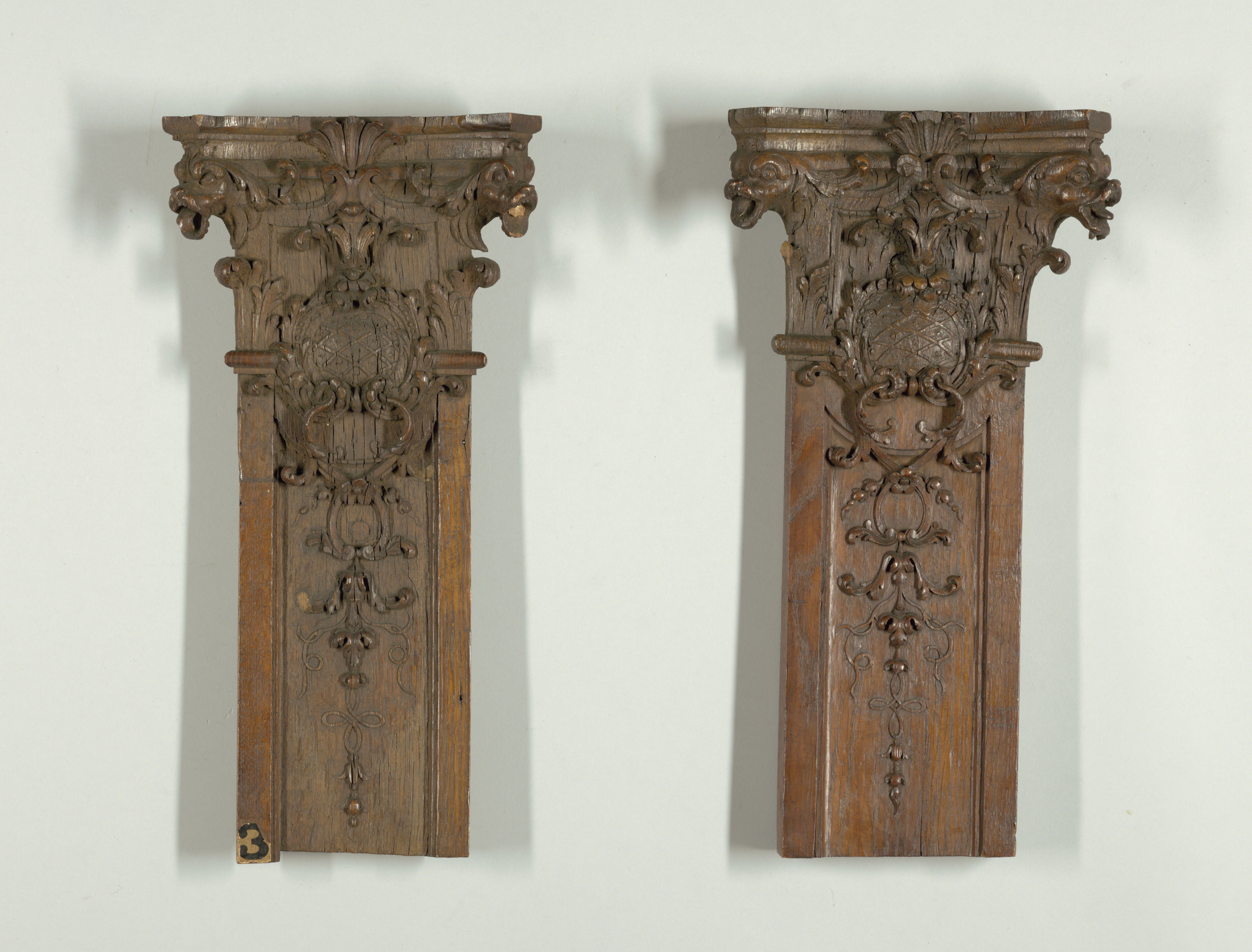
Two fragments of French pilasters, made of oak, in the Cooper Hewitt, Smithsonian Design Museum (New York City)

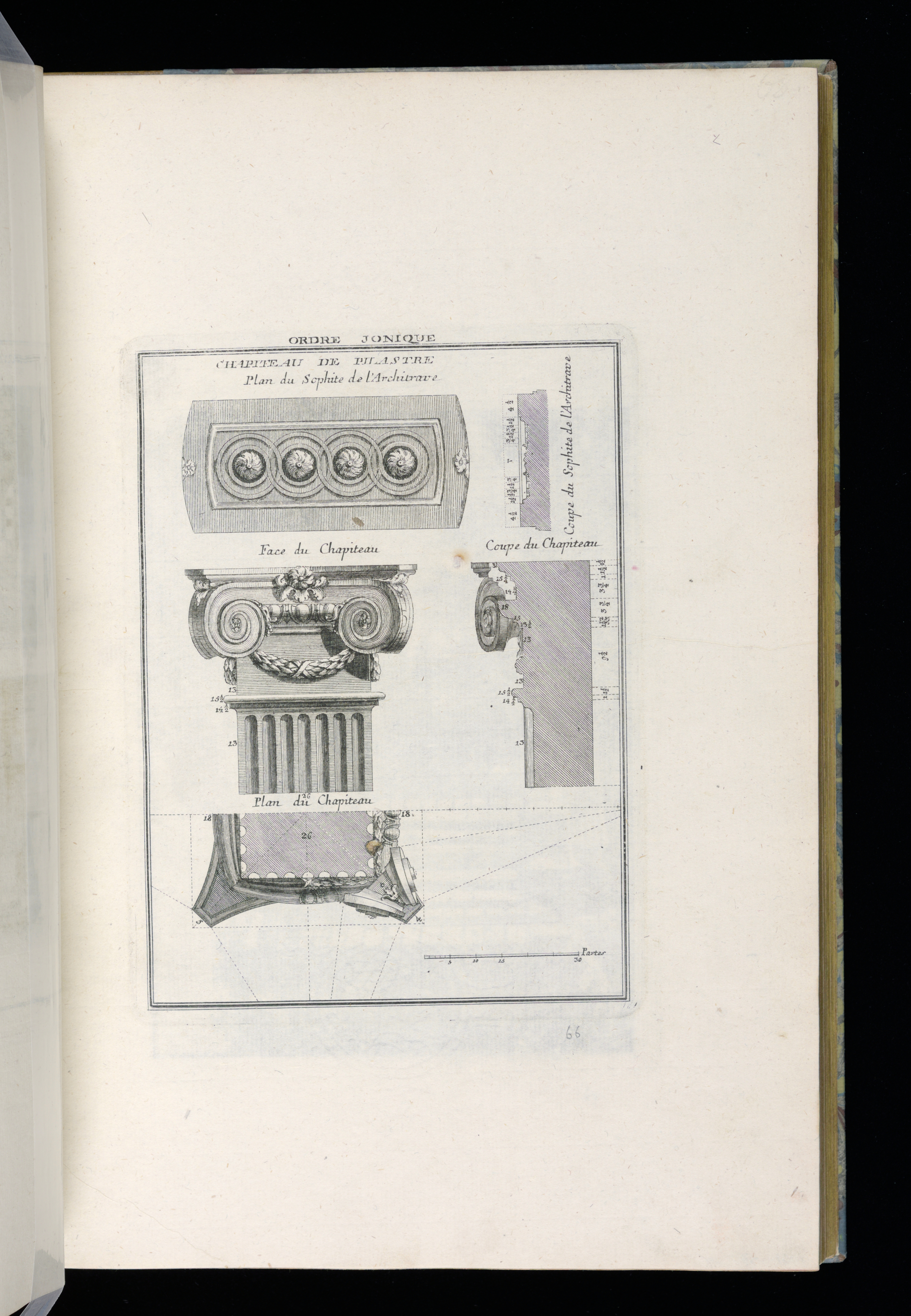
Illustrations of Ionic pilasters with festoons on their capitals, from Germany, in the Cooper Hewitt, Smithsonian Design Museum

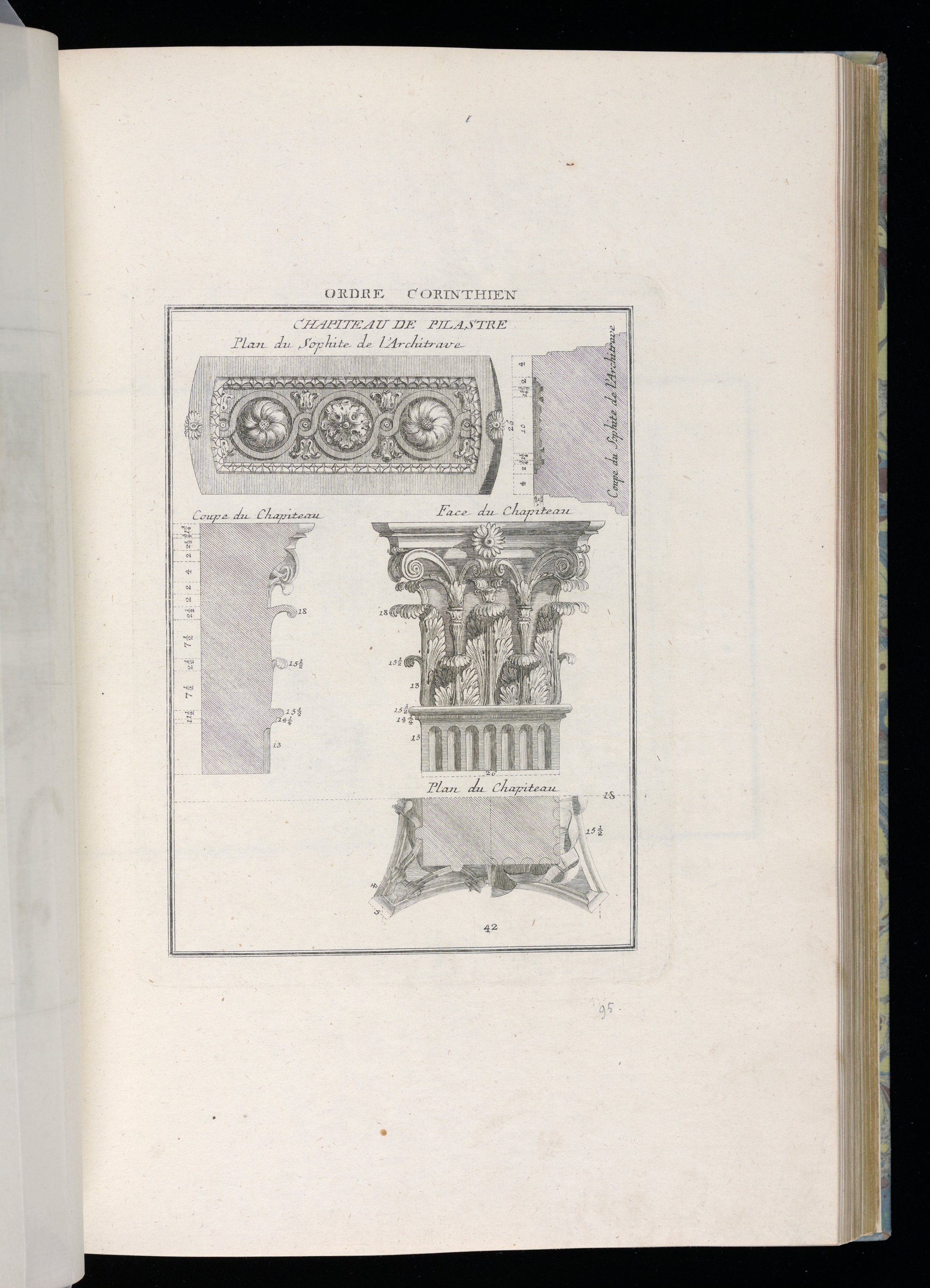
Illustrations of Corinthian pilasters, from Germany, in the Cooper Hewitt, Smithsonian Design Museum

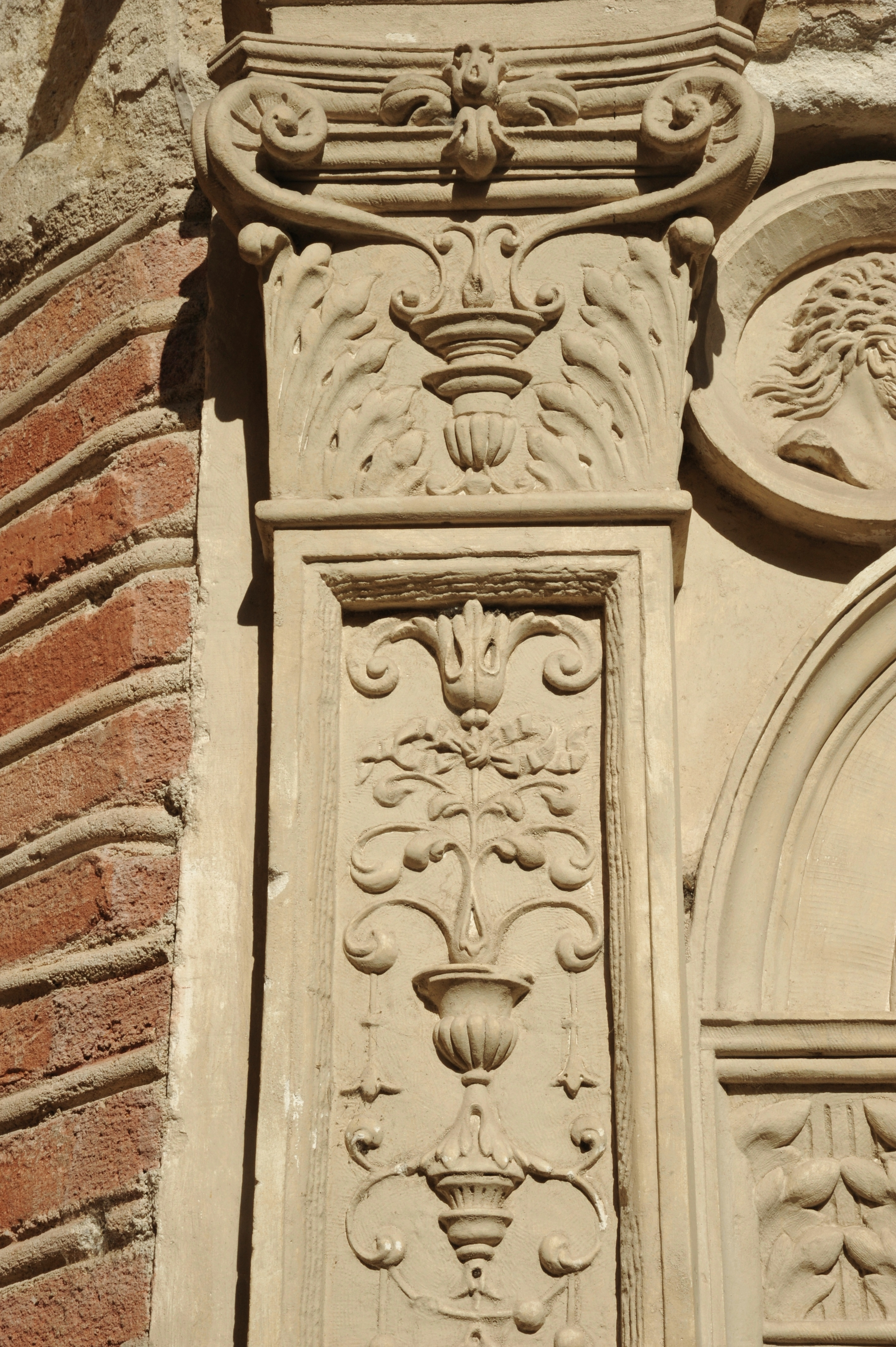
Part of a Renaissance Corinthian pilaster of the Hôtel du Vieux-Raisin (Toulouse, France)

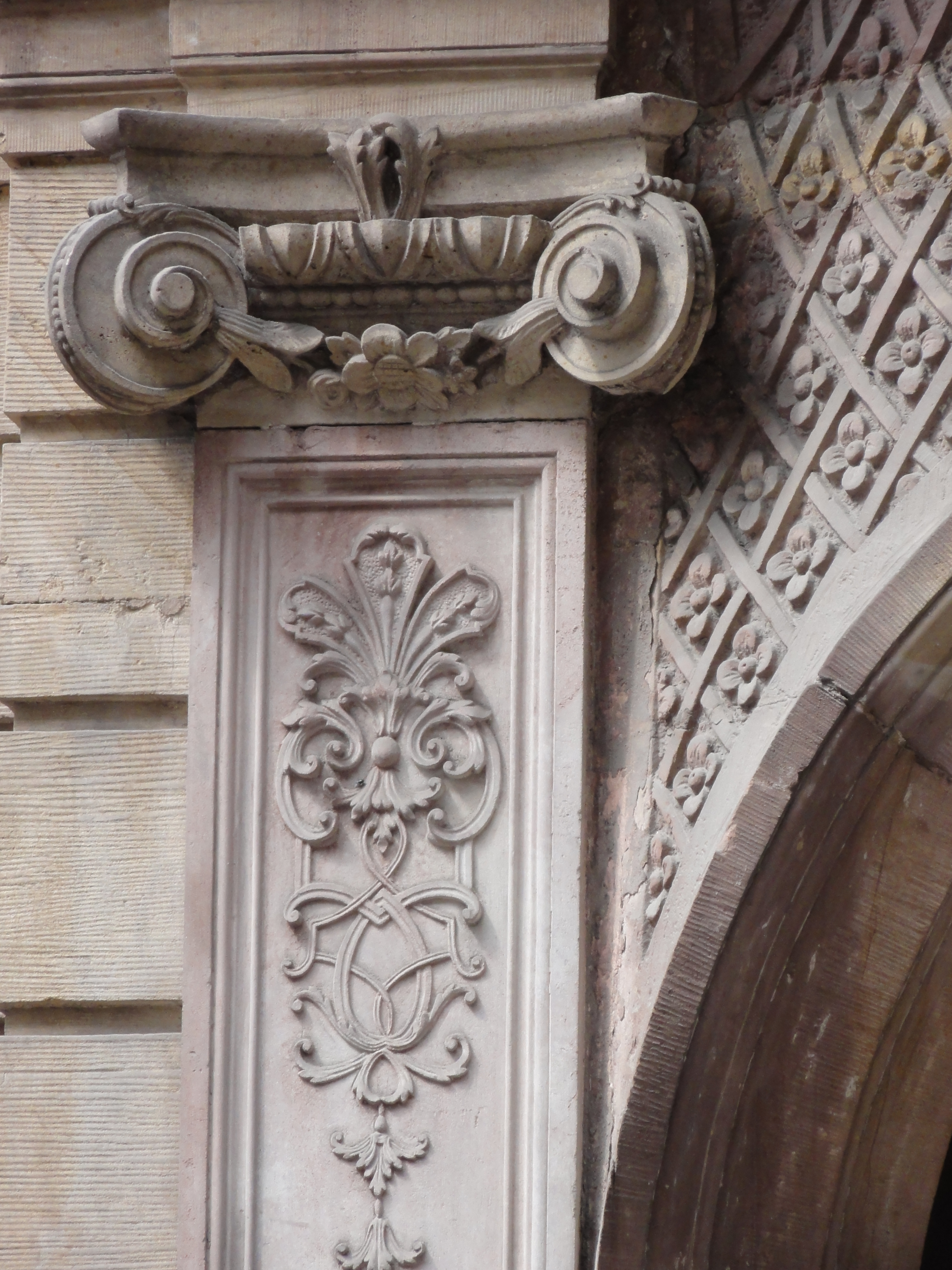
Pilaster in Strasbourg (France), being Renaissance and Louis XIV style at the same time

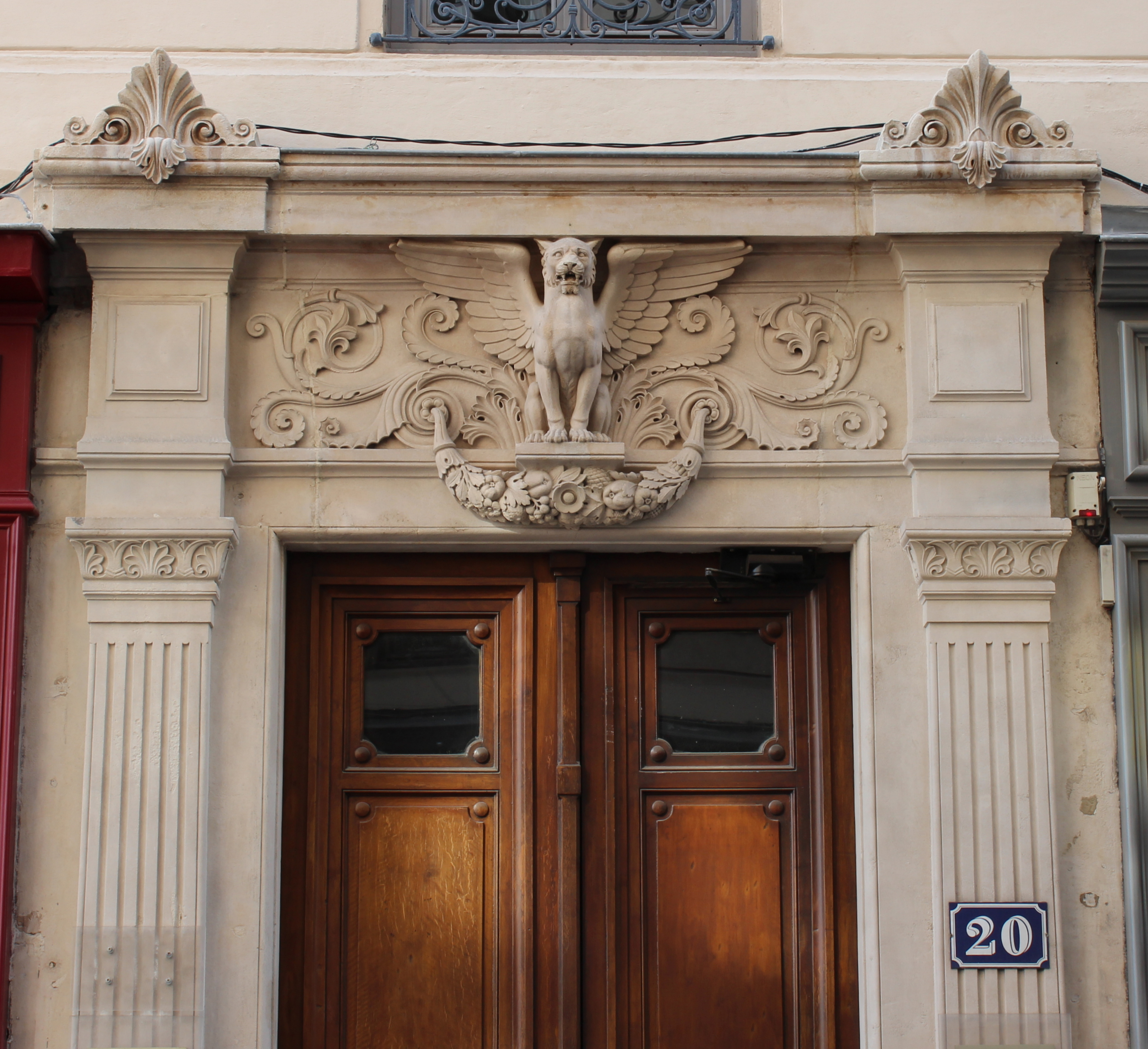
A pair of pilasters flanking a door in Lyon (France)

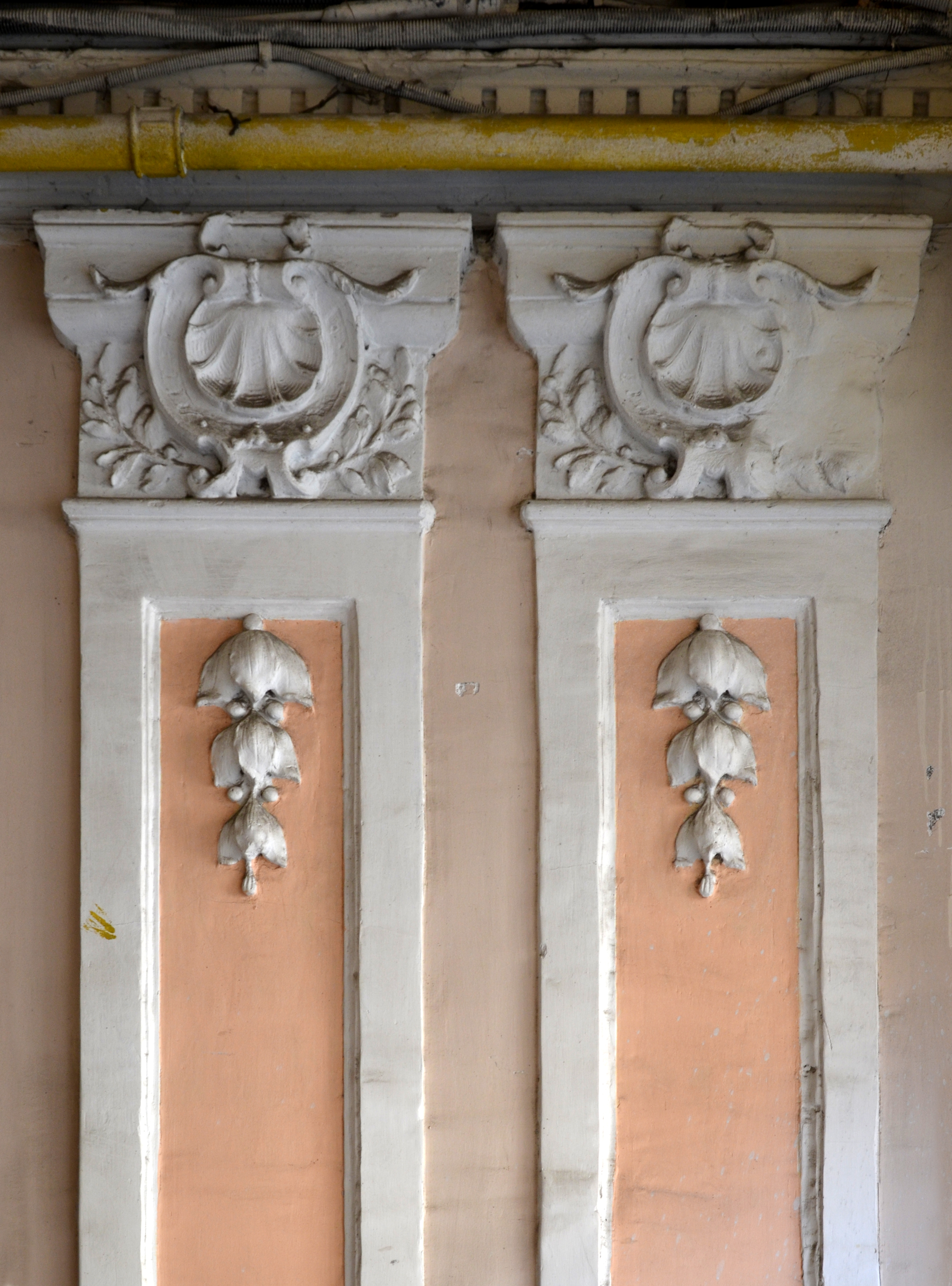
Two pilasters in Lviv (Ukraine)

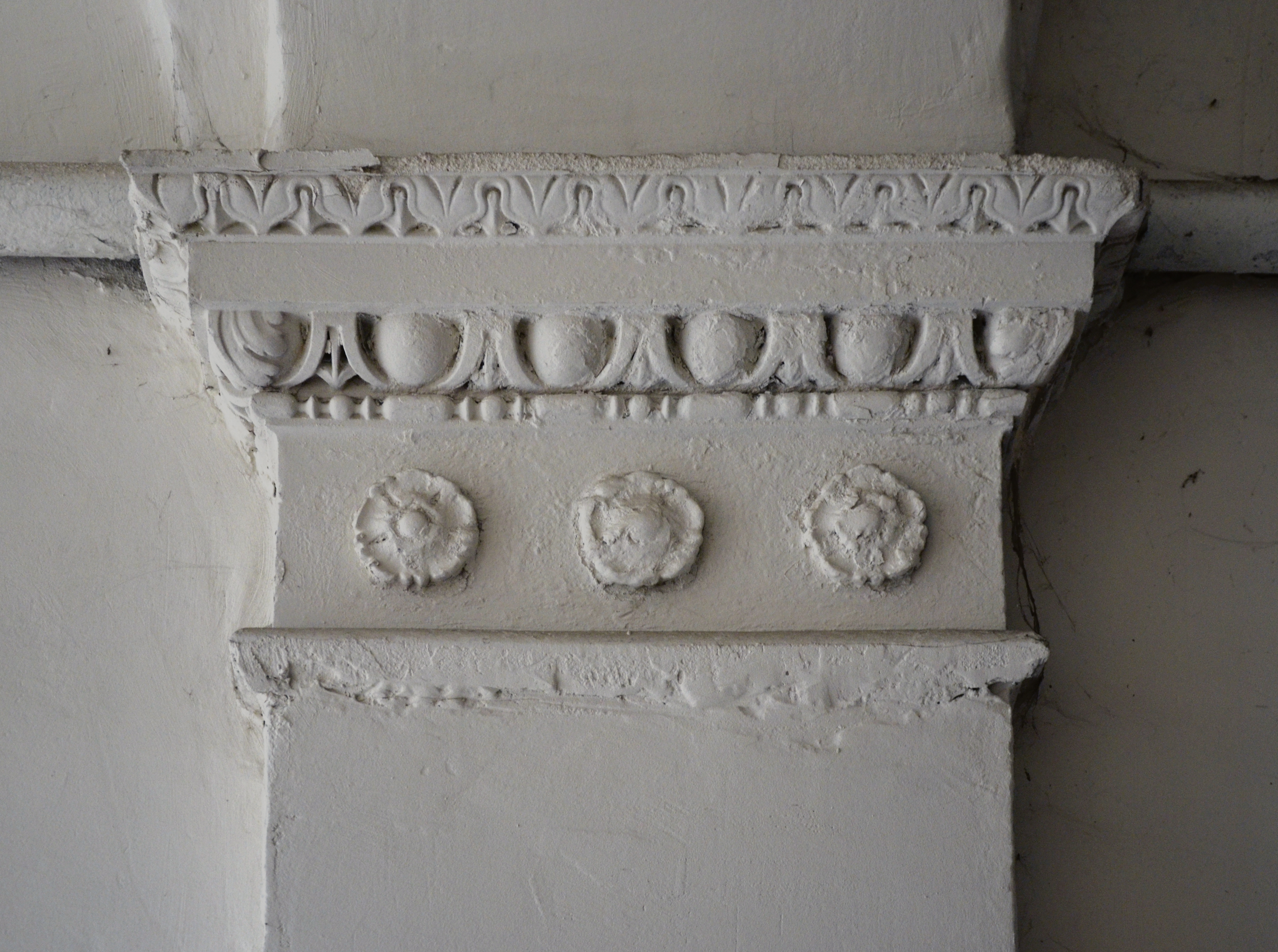
Capital of a Doric pilaster from Lviv

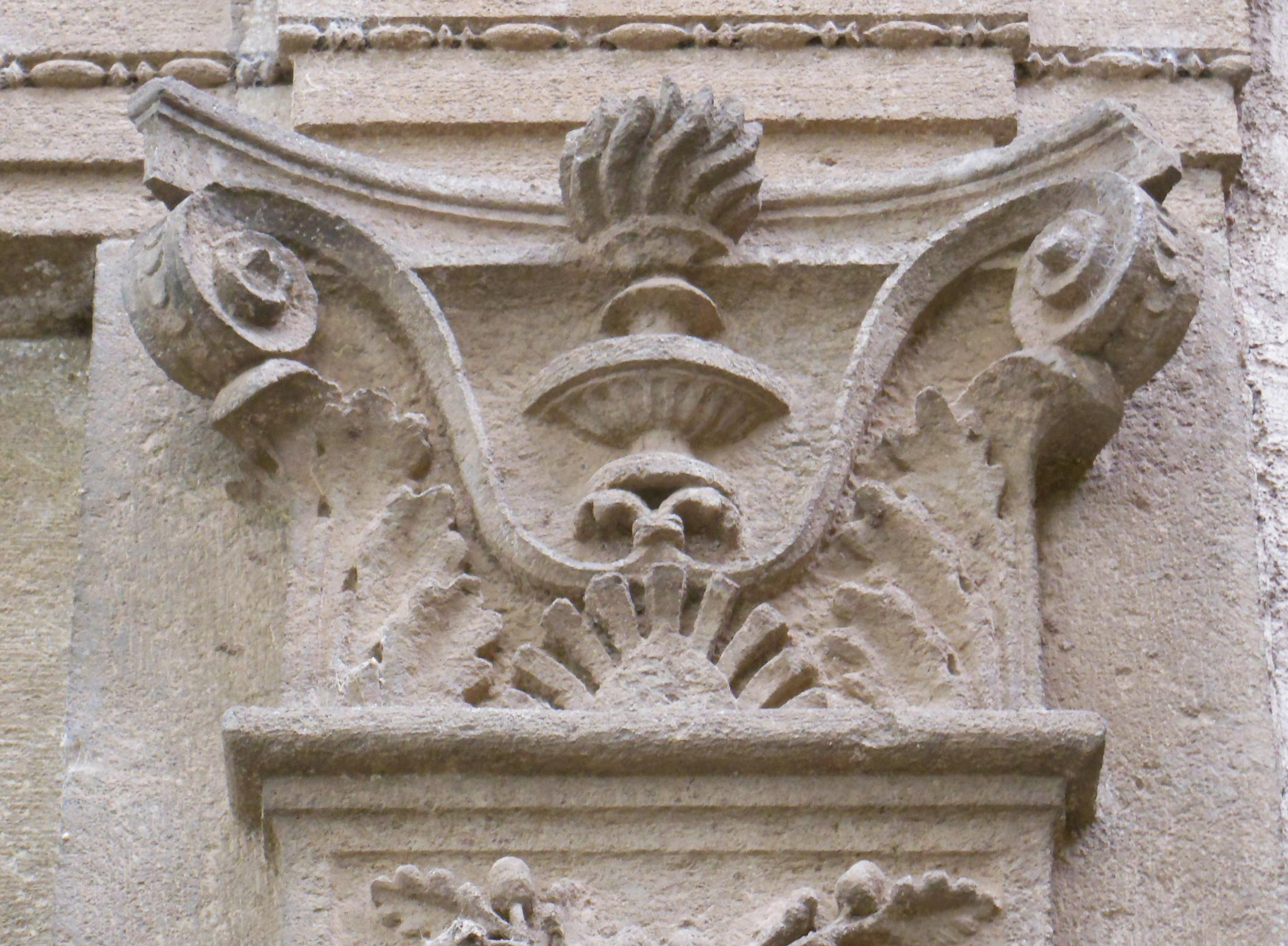
Corinthianesque capital of a pilaster from Grottaferrata (Italy)

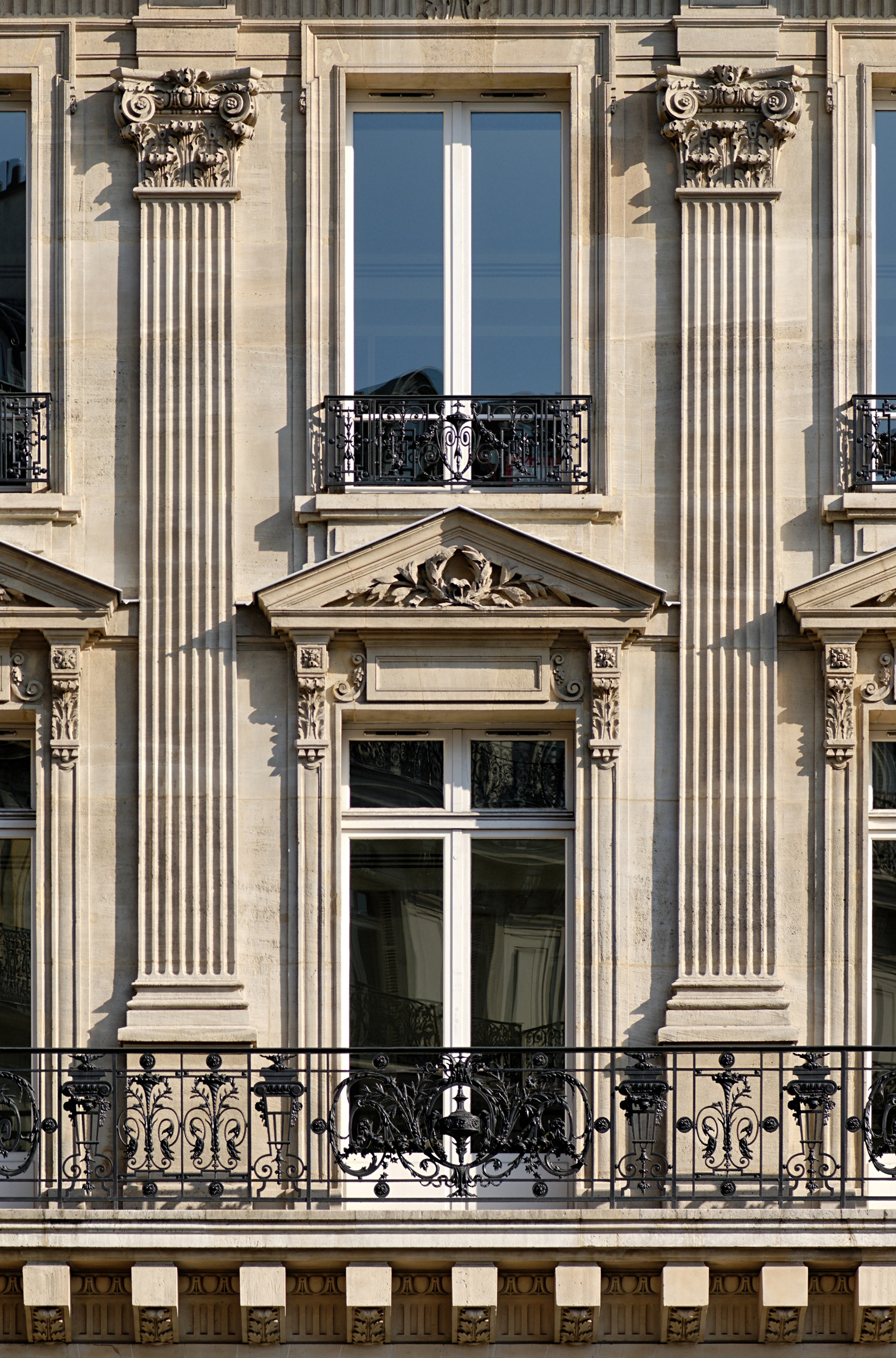
Colossal order of Composite pilasters. 1st and 2nd floors of a 19th-century building, 8 avenue de l'Opéra (Paris)

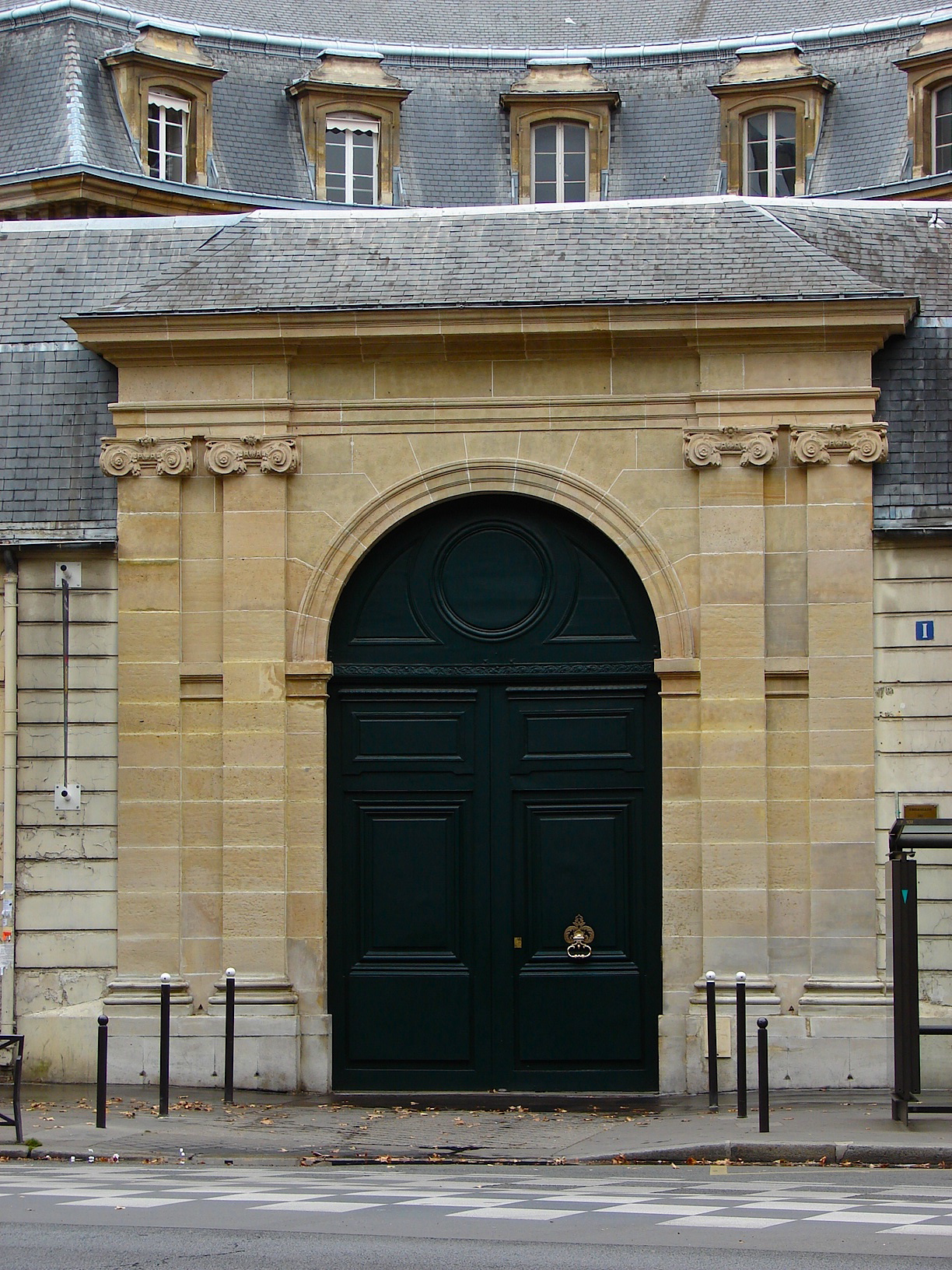
Two pairs of Ionic pilasters flanking a door in Paris

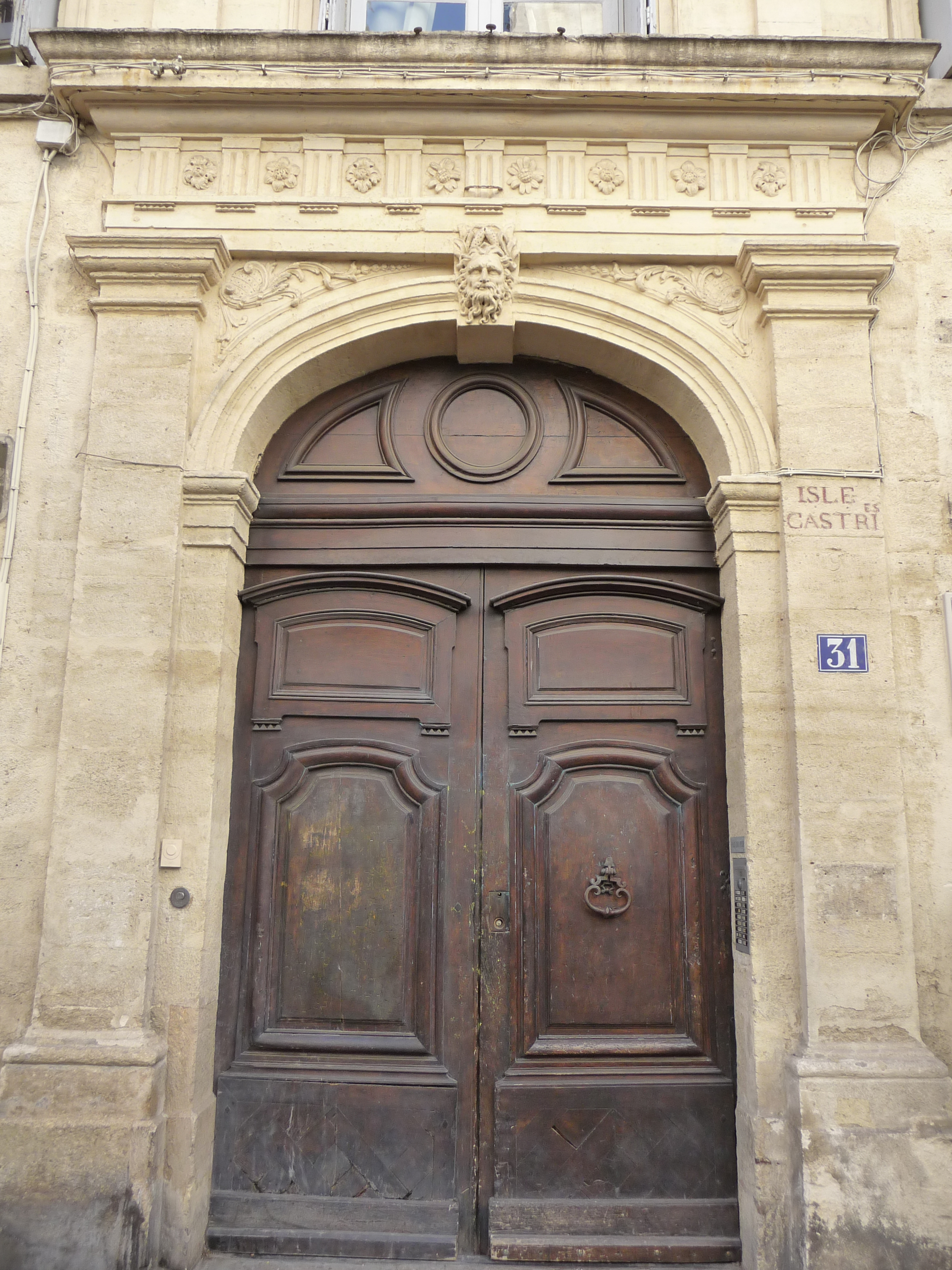
A pair of Doric pilasters flanking a door in Montpellier (France)

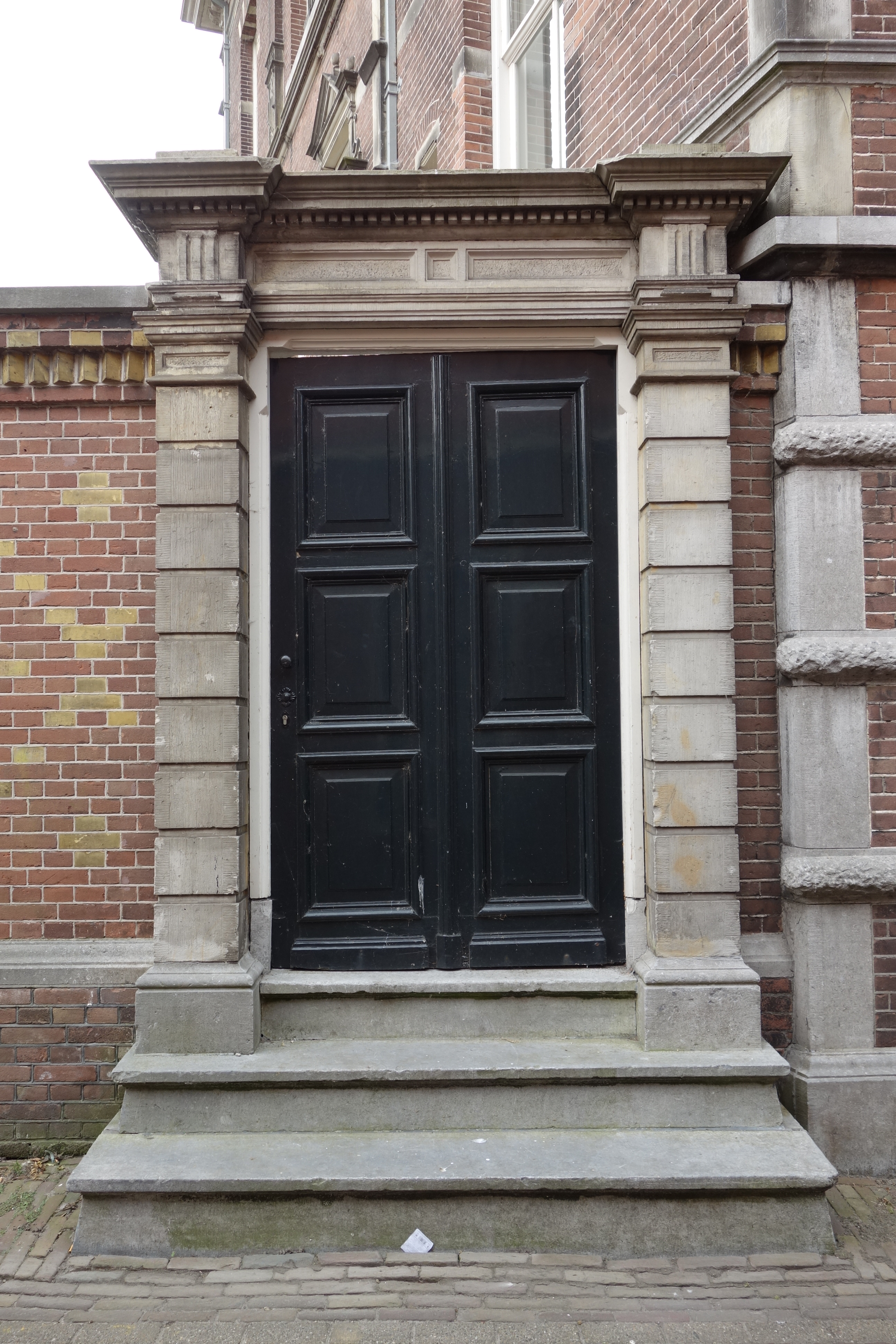
A pair of Doric pilasters flanking a door in Enkhuizen (the Netherlands)

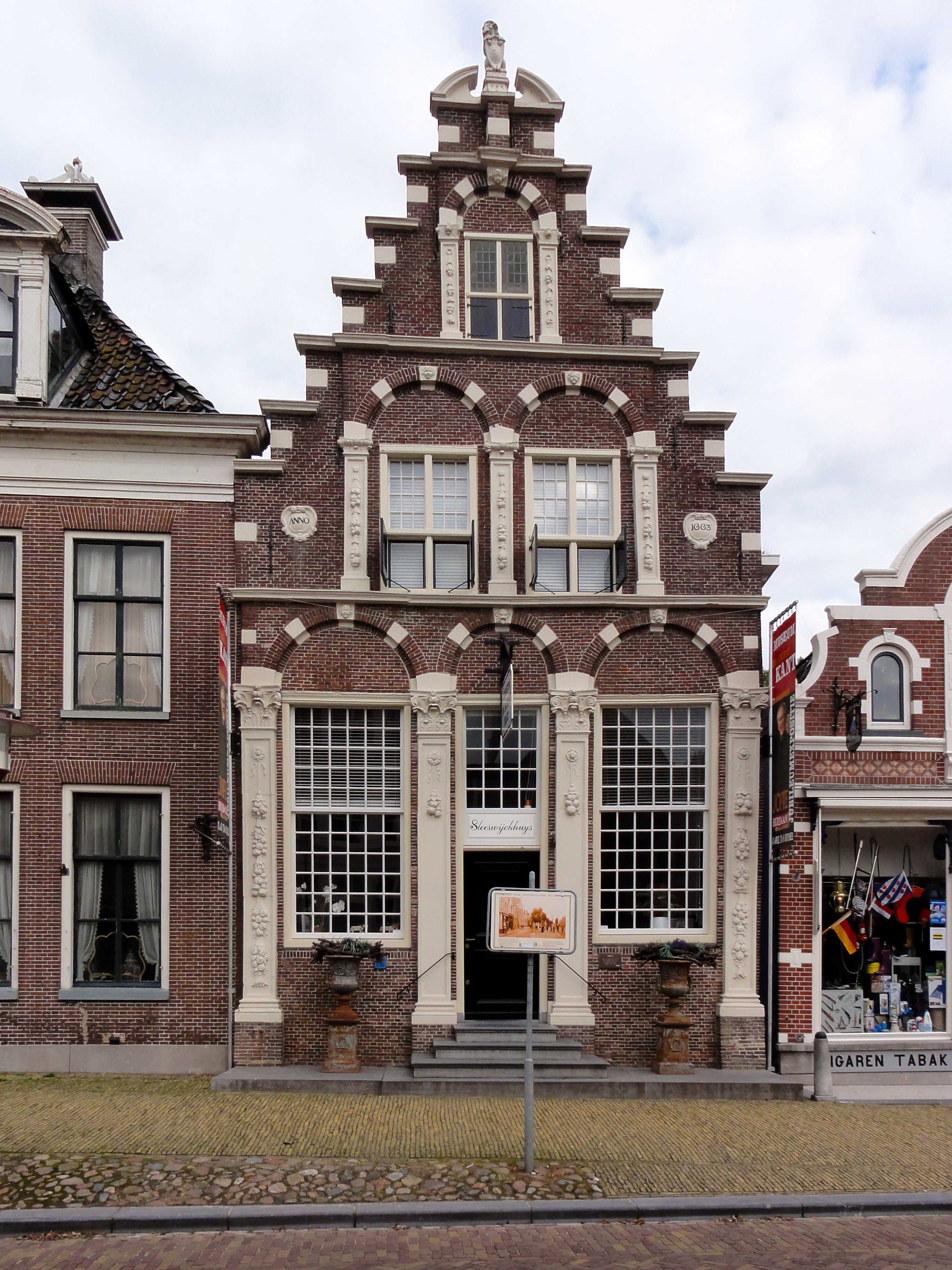
House from 1663, decorated with Corinthian pilasters, in Workum (the Netherlands)

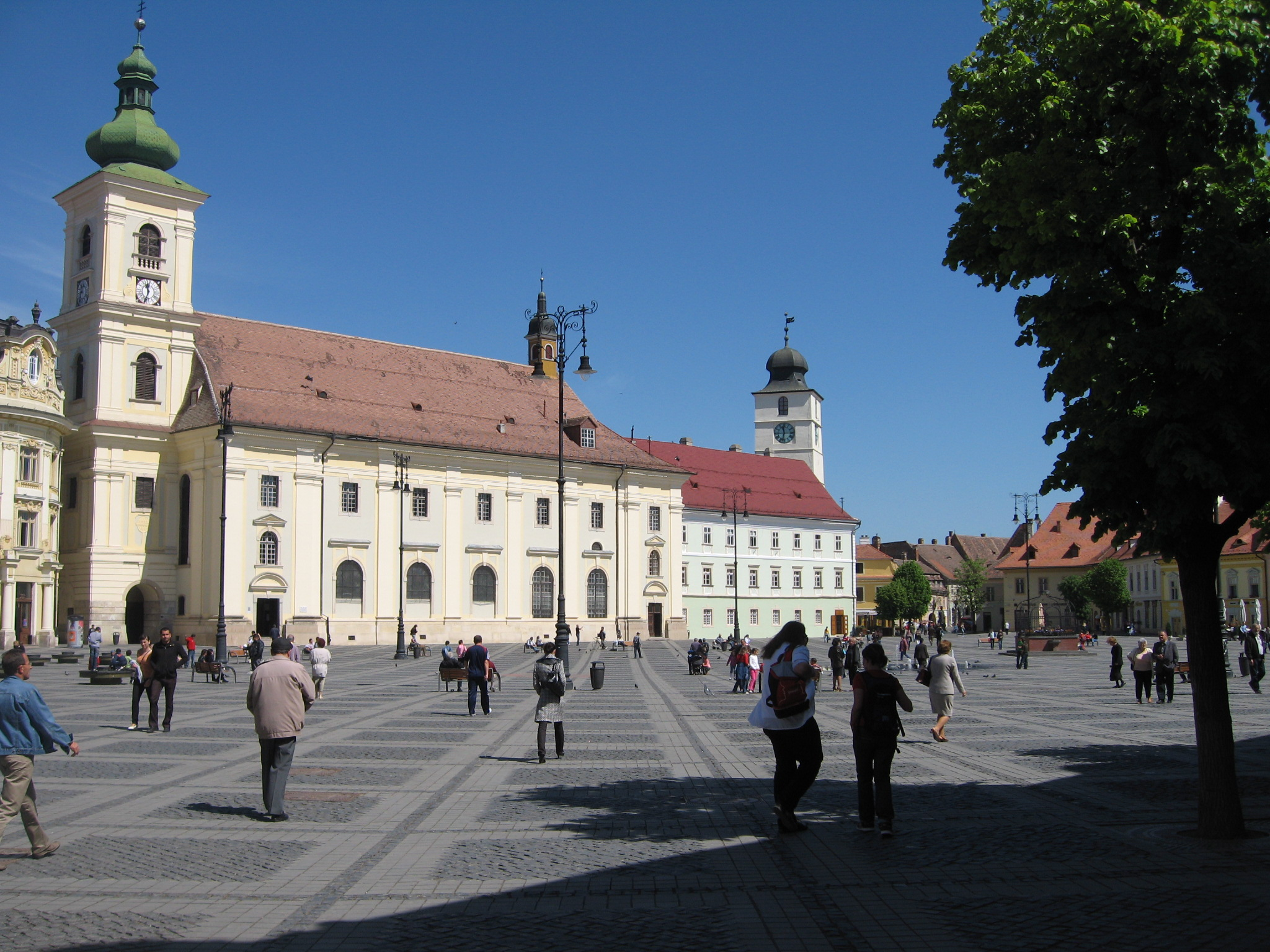
Doric pilasters on the Jesuit Church of Sibiu (Transylvania, Romania)

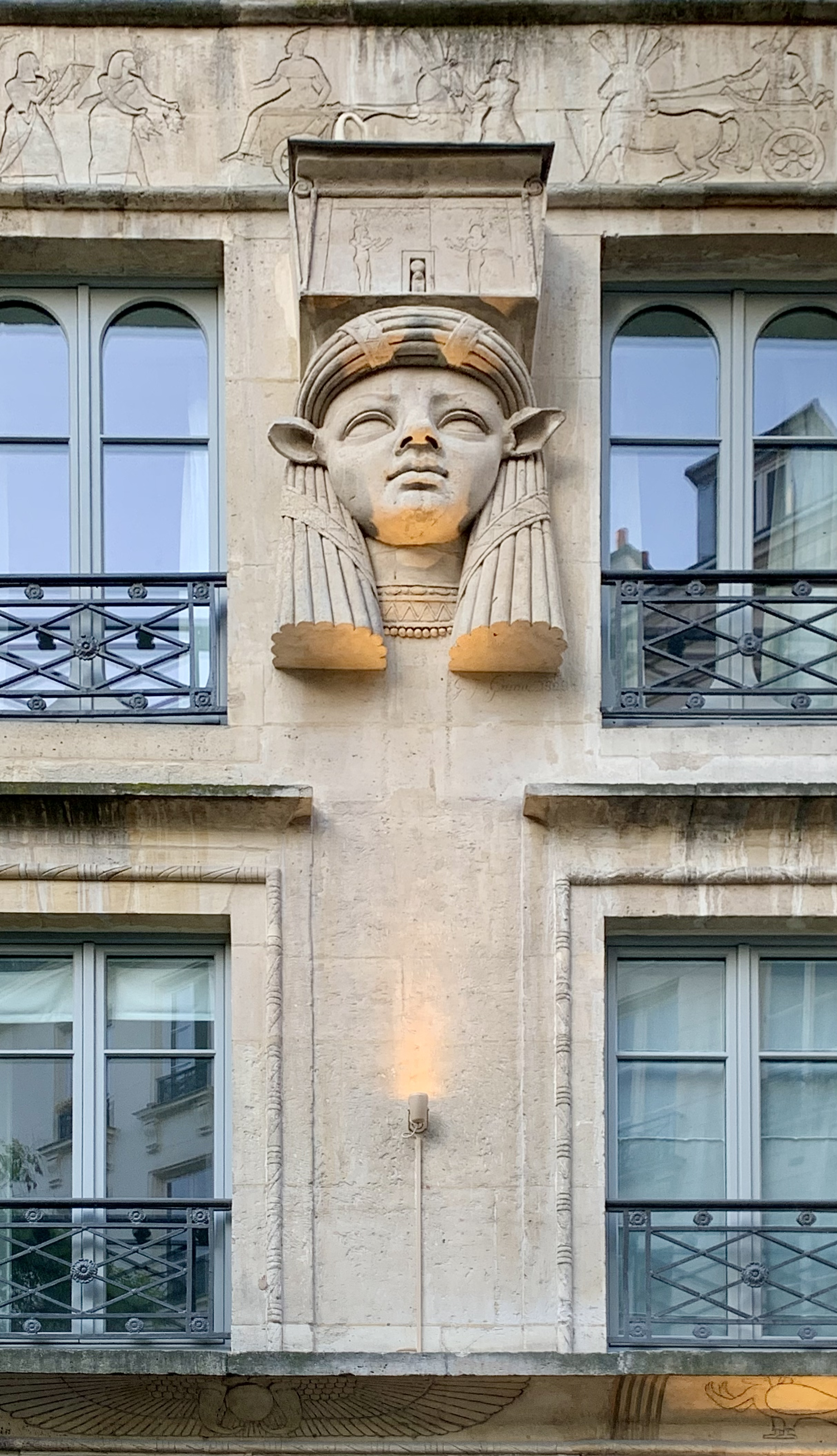
Egyptian Revival hathoric pilaster on the Foire du Caire building (Paris)

== See also ==
- Glossary of architecture
- Classical order
- Lesene
- Post and lintel

== Sources ==
- Drysdale, Robert G.; Hamid, Ahmad A. (2005). "Columns and Pilasters". Masonry Structures: Behaviour and Design. pp. 429–452. ISBN 978-0-9737209-0-7.
- Lewis, Philippa, and Gillian Darley (1986). Dictionary of Ornament. New York: Pantheon.
