= Renaissance in Lombardy =

Aspects of Renaissance art and culture in Lombardy

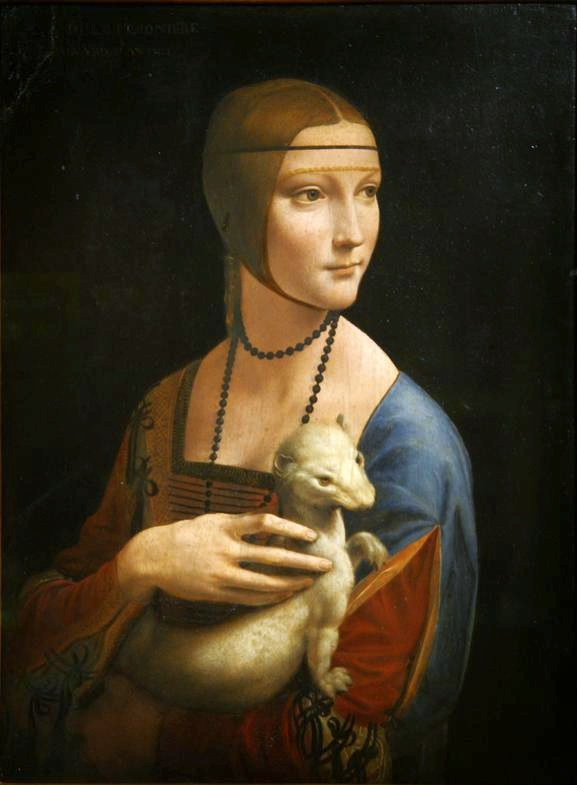
Leonardo da Vinci, Lady with an Ermine (1488–1490)

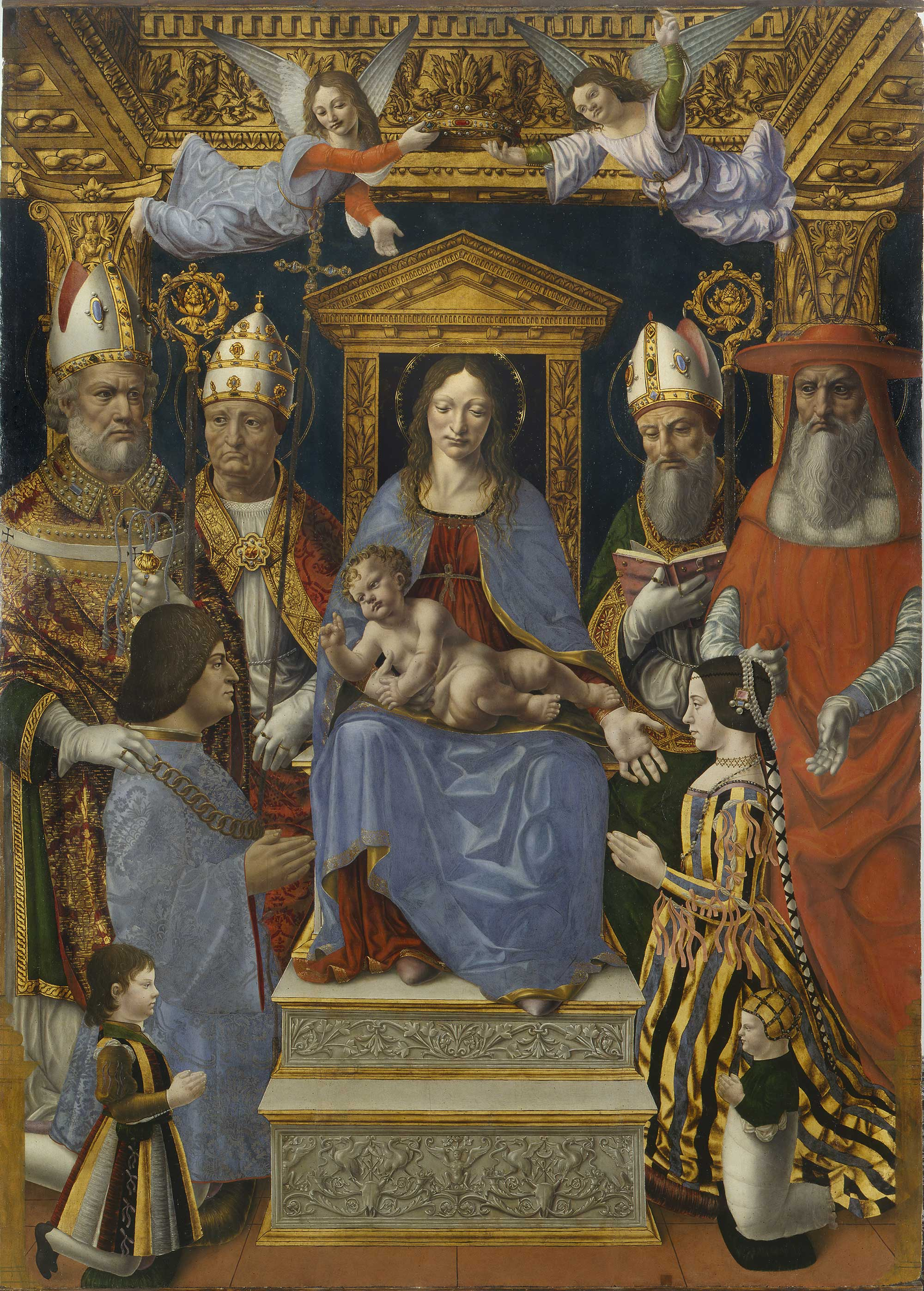
Sforza Altarpiece (c. 1494)

The Italian Renaissance in Lombardy, in the Duchy of Milan in the mid-15th century, started in the International Lombard Gothic period and gave way to Lombard humanism with the passage of power between the Visconti and Sforza families. In the second half of the 15th century the Lombard artistic scene developed without disruption, with influences gradually linked to Florentine, Ferrarese, and Paduan styles. With the arrival of Bramante (1479) and Leonardo da Vinci (1482), Milan reached absolute artistic heights in the Italian and European panorama, while still demonstrating the possibilities of coexistence between the artistic avant-garde and the Gothic substratum.

== The Visconti ==
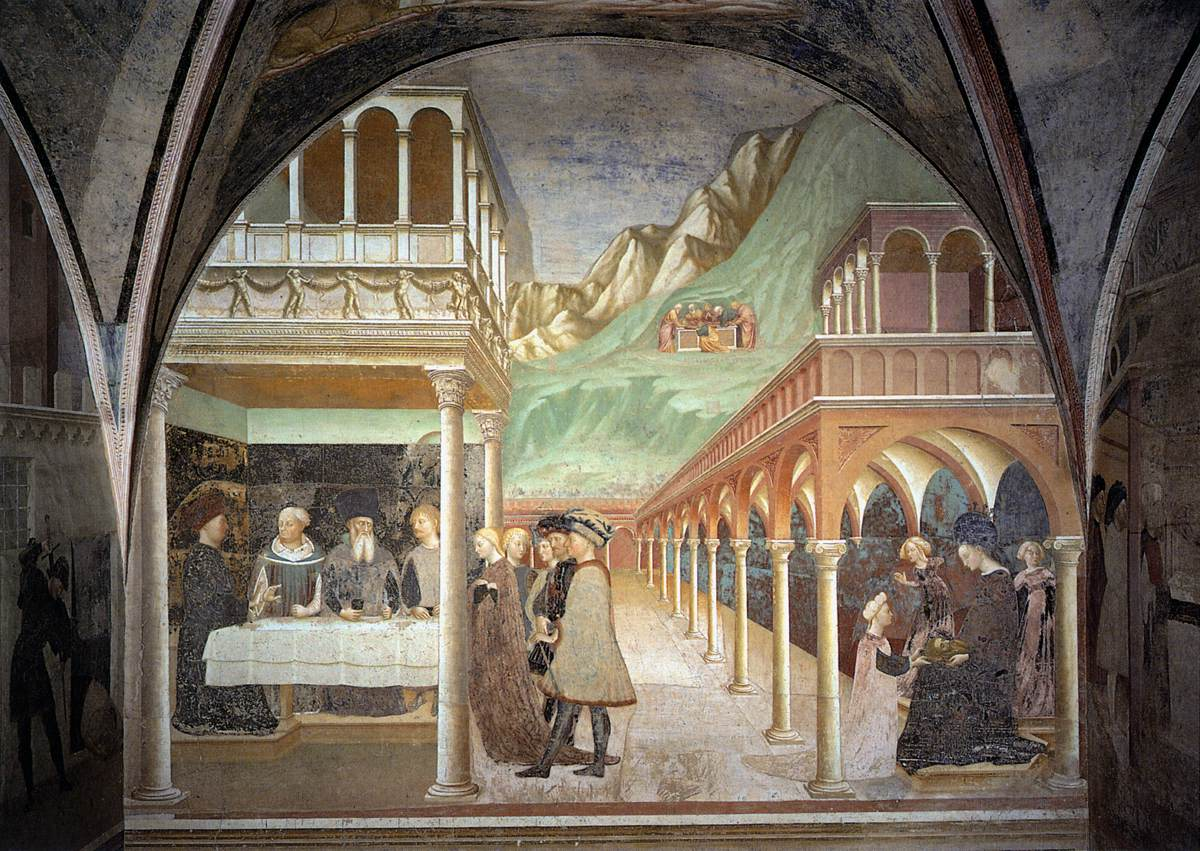
Masolino, Banquet of Herod, Castiglione Olona

In the first half of the 15th century, Lombardy was the Italian region where the International Gothic style had the greatest following, so much so that in Europe the expression ouvrage de Lombardie was synonymous with an object of precious workmanship, referring especially to the miniatures and jewelry that were an expression of an elitist, courtly taste.

After the marriage of Galeazzo II Visconti to Bianca of Savoy, sister of Amadeus VI of Savoy, French and English chivalric culture spread in Lombardy. The marriage of their children to members of the English and French royal families left a mark on the ideology and culture of the court. The great Visconti Castle, built by Galeazzo II in Pavia, was furnished in the style of a French castle, despite being an imposing fortified building. Gian Galeazzo Visconti, who succeeded him, built the great Carthusian monastery in Pavia that was to contain his mausoleum. The court spirit also prevails in the monks' cells converted into small houses of "courtiers" with loggias.

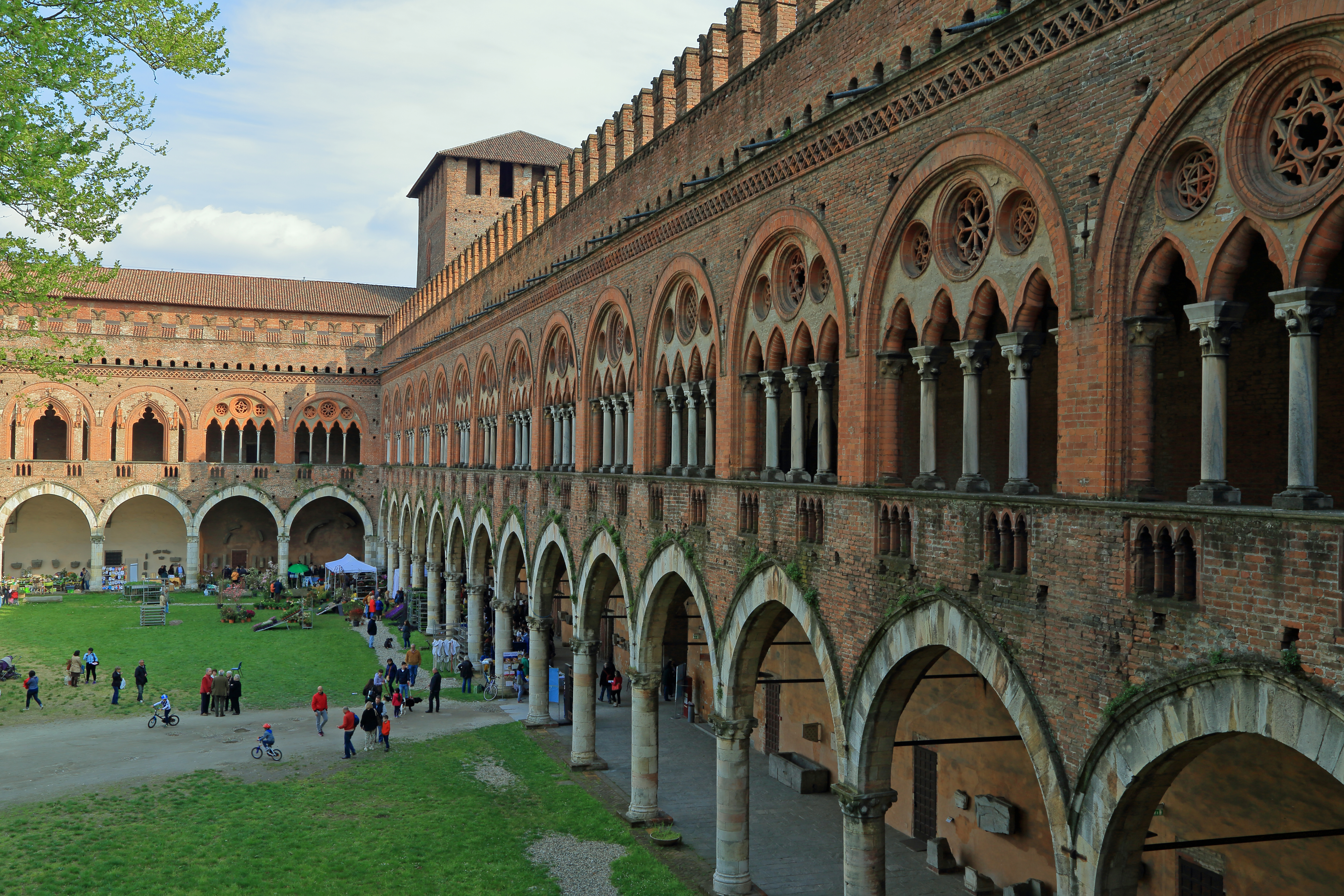
Courtyard of the Visconti Castle of Pavia (1360-1365)

However, contacts with the Tuscan and Flanders artistic avant-gardes were quite frequent, due to the particularly well-articulated network of commercial and dynastic relations. French, Burgundian, German, and Italian craftsmen worked on the construction site of Milan Cathedral, which began in 1386, developing an international style, especially in the school of sculpture, which was indispensable for the realization of the cathedral's impressive decorative set. As early as around 1435 Masolino was working in Castiglione Olona, near Varese, showing innovations in the use of perspective, attenuated, however, by an attention to local figurative culture that made the new style more comprehensible and assimilable.

== Francesco Sforza (1450–1466) ==
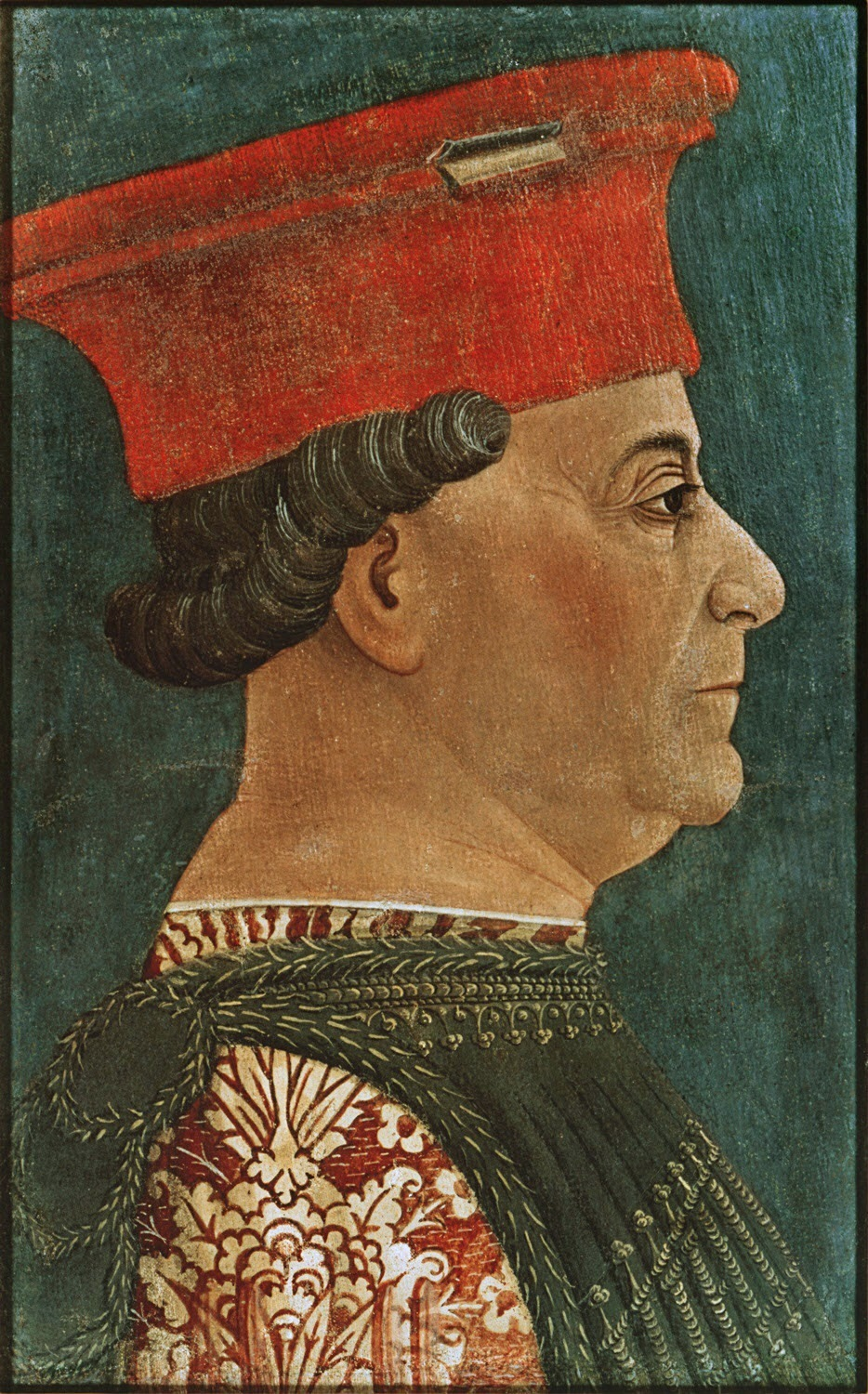
Bonifacio Bembo, Portrait of Francesco Sforza (Pinacoteca di Brera, Milan)

After the utopian attempt to revive the communal institutions on the death of Filippo Maria Visconti with the Ambrosian Republic (1447–1450), the transfer of power to the Sforzas, with Francesco, husband of Bianca Maria Visconti, had almost the appearance of a legitimate succession, with no clear ruptures from the past.

In the field of art as well, Francesco's taste, and to a large extent that of his descendants, was aligned with the sumptuous, ornate and pompously celebratory taste of the Visconti: many "Visconti" artists were commissioned, such as Bonifacio Bembo. Nevertheless, the alliance with Florence and repeated contacts with Padua and Ferrara favored a penetration of the Renaissance style, especially through the exchange of miniaturists.

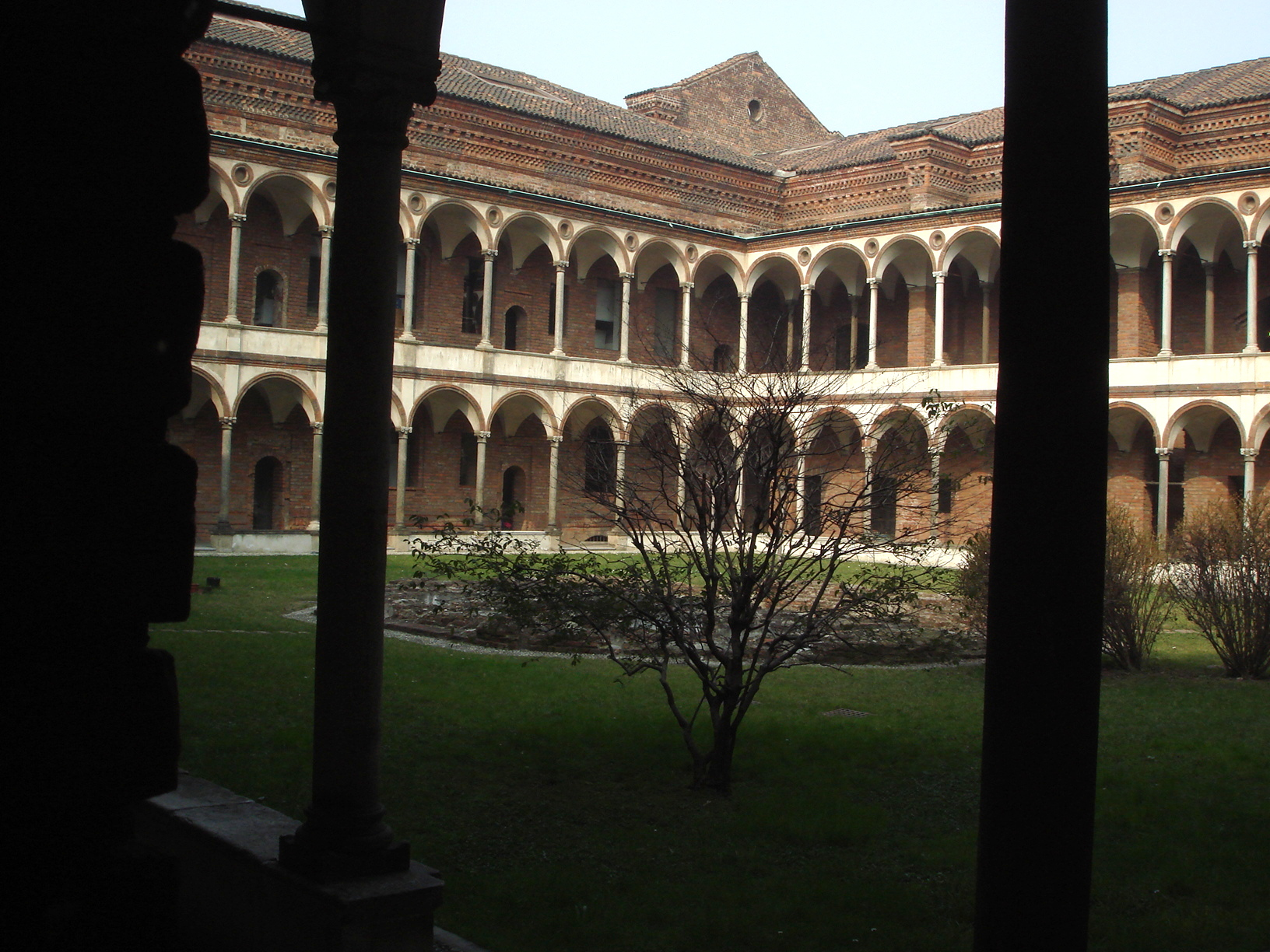
The Cloister of the Baths in the former Ospedale Maggiore, Milan

=== Architecture ===
To consolidate his power, Francesco immediately began the reconstruction of the castle of Porta Giovia, the Visconti's Milanese residence. In architecture, however, the most significant undertaking remained the Cathedral, while the Solari's buildings still looked towards the Gothic or even Lombard Romanesque tradition.

In addition, to emphasize his legitimacy and piety, Francesco Sforza had a new cloister built in the Certosa di Pavia and confirmed all the privileges granted by his predecessors to the monastery, thus exploiting the Certosa as a link between the old Visconti dynasty and the Sforza lineage.

==== Filarete ====
The stay of Filarete, beginning in 1451, was the first significant Renaissance presence in Milan. The artist, recommended by Piero de' Medici, was given important commissions, due to his hybrid style that won over the Sforza court. He was a proponent of sharp lines, but he did not dislike a certain decorative richness, nor did he apply Brunelleschi's "grammar of orders" with extreme rigor. He was entrusted with the construction of the Castle Tower, Bergamo Cathedral, and the Ospedale Maggiore.

In the latter work in particular, linked to a desire of the new prince to promote his own image, one can see the inequalities between the rigor of the basic design, set to a functional division of space and a regular plan, and the lack of integration with the surrounding building fabric, due to the oversized building. The Hospital's floor plan is rectangular, a central courtyard dividing it into two zones each traversed by two inner orthogonal arms that form eight vast courtyards. The same plan would later be taken up in the same years by similar buildings in Lombardy, such as the San Matteo Hospital in Pavia. The rhythmic purity of the succession of round arches of the courtyards, derived from Brunelleschi's teachings, is counterbalanced by an exuberance of the terracotta decorations (although they were largely due to Lombard successors).

==== Portinari Chapel ====
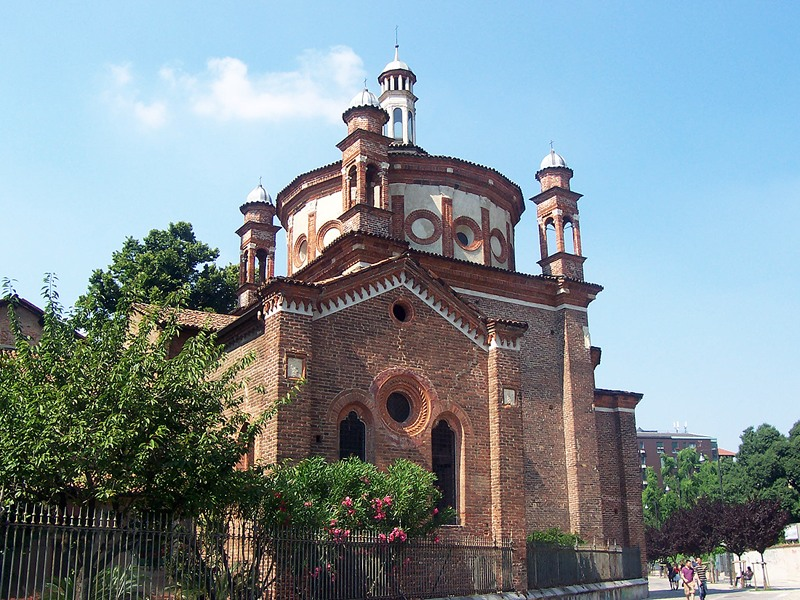
Exterior of the Portinari Chapel

The arrival of more mature Renaissance formulations in the city is linked to commissions from Pigello Portinari, the Medici's agent for their banking branch in Milan. In addition to the construction of an office of the Banco Mediceo, now lost, Pigello had a family funeral chapel built in Sant'Eustorgio that bears his name, the Portinari Chapel, where the relic of the head of St. Peter Martyr was also located.

The structure is inspired by Brunelleschi's Sagrestia Vecchia in San Lorenzo in Florence, with a square room equipped with a scarsella and covered by a dome with sixteen ribbed segments. Some details in the decoration are also inspired by the Florentine model, such as the frieze of cherubs or the roundels in the spandrels of the dome, but others depart from it, marking a Lombard origin. These are the tiburium protecting the dome, the terracotta decoration, the presence of pointed biforas, and the general decorative exuberance. The interior in particular departs from the Florentine model in the vibrant richness of its decorations, such as the rich imbrication of the dome in sloping hues, the frieze with angels on the drum, and the numerous frescoes by Vincenzo Foppa in the upper part of the walls.

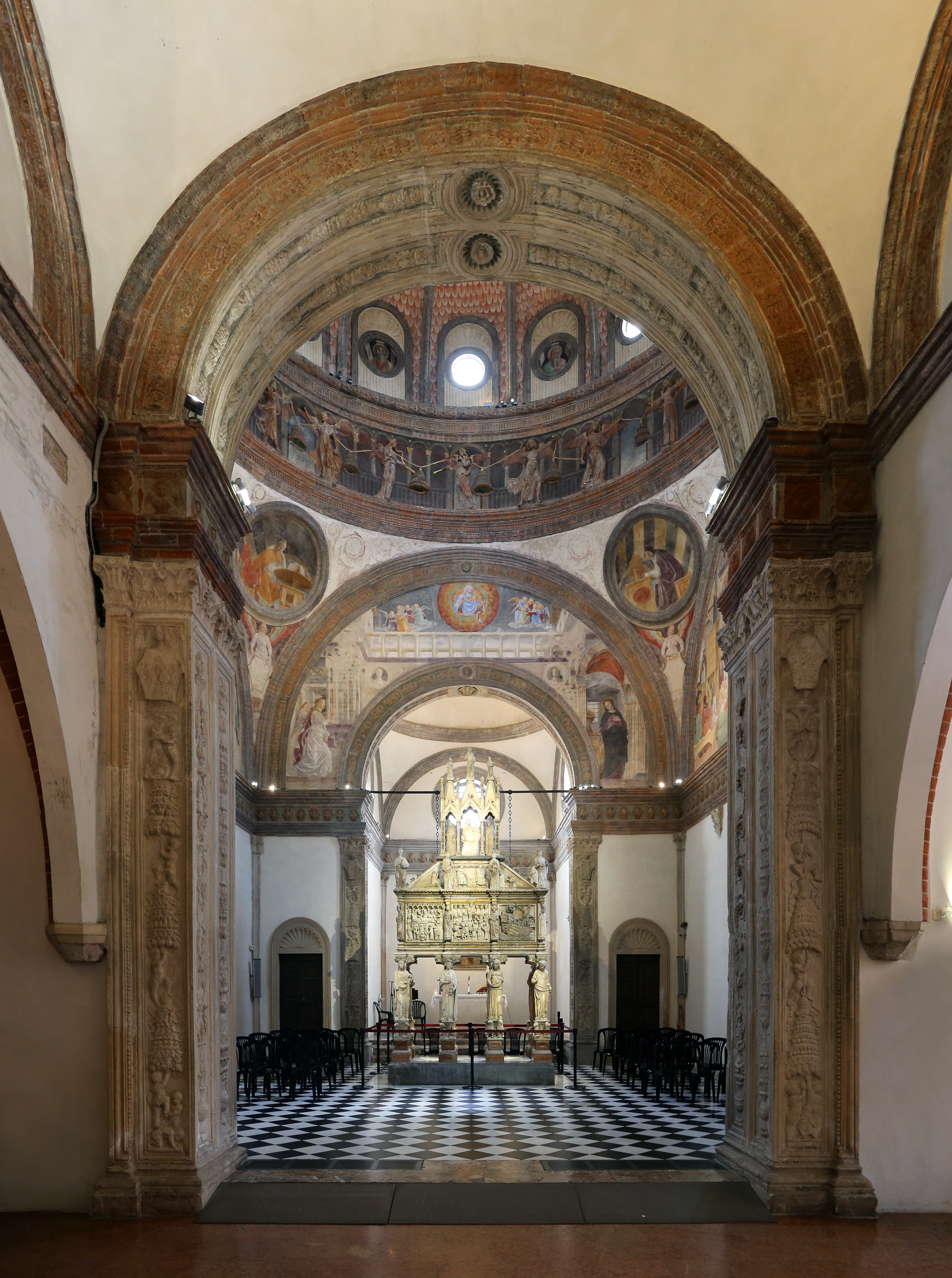
Portinari Chapel, interior

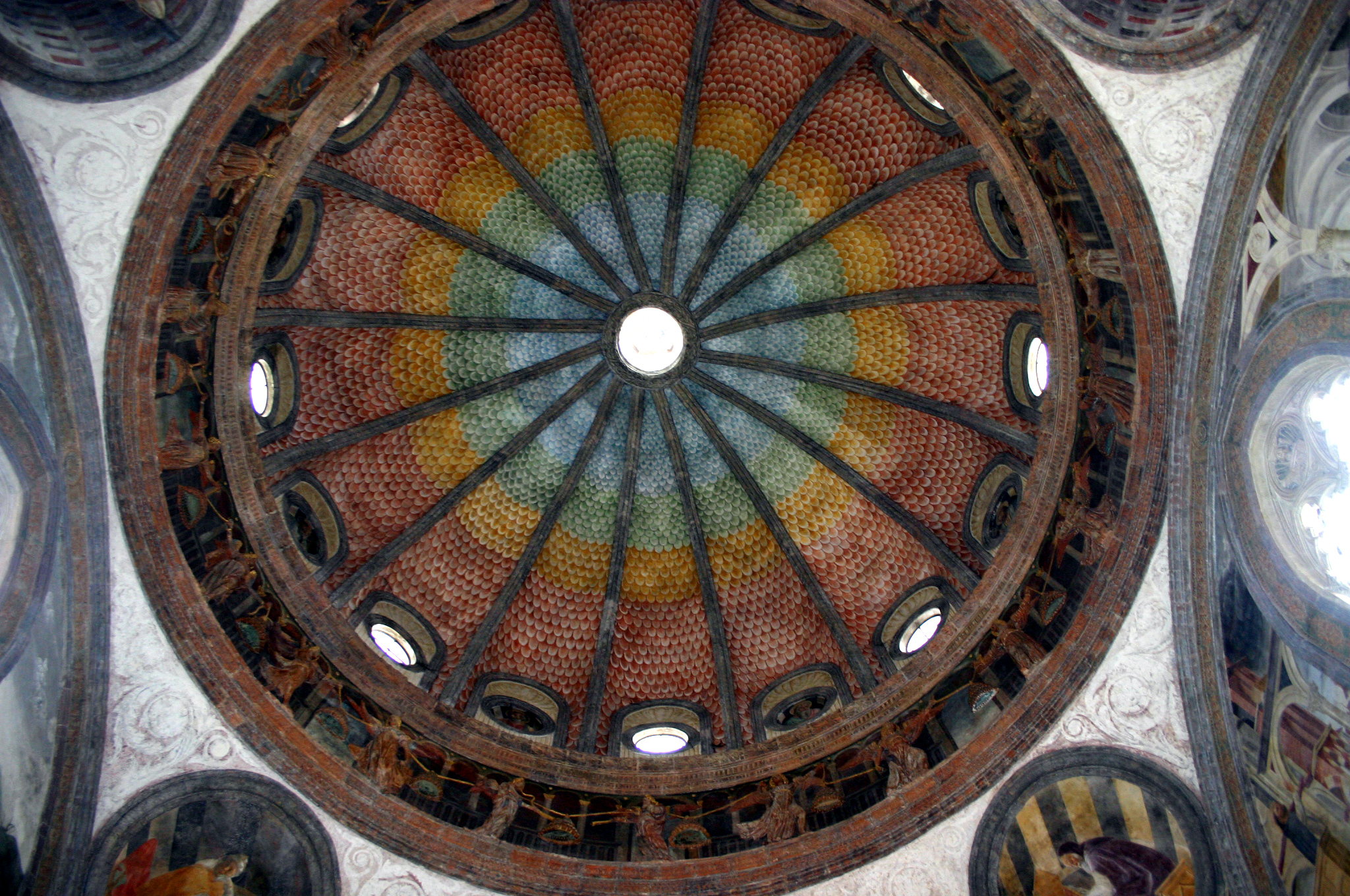
Portinari Chapel, the dome

=== Urban planning ===
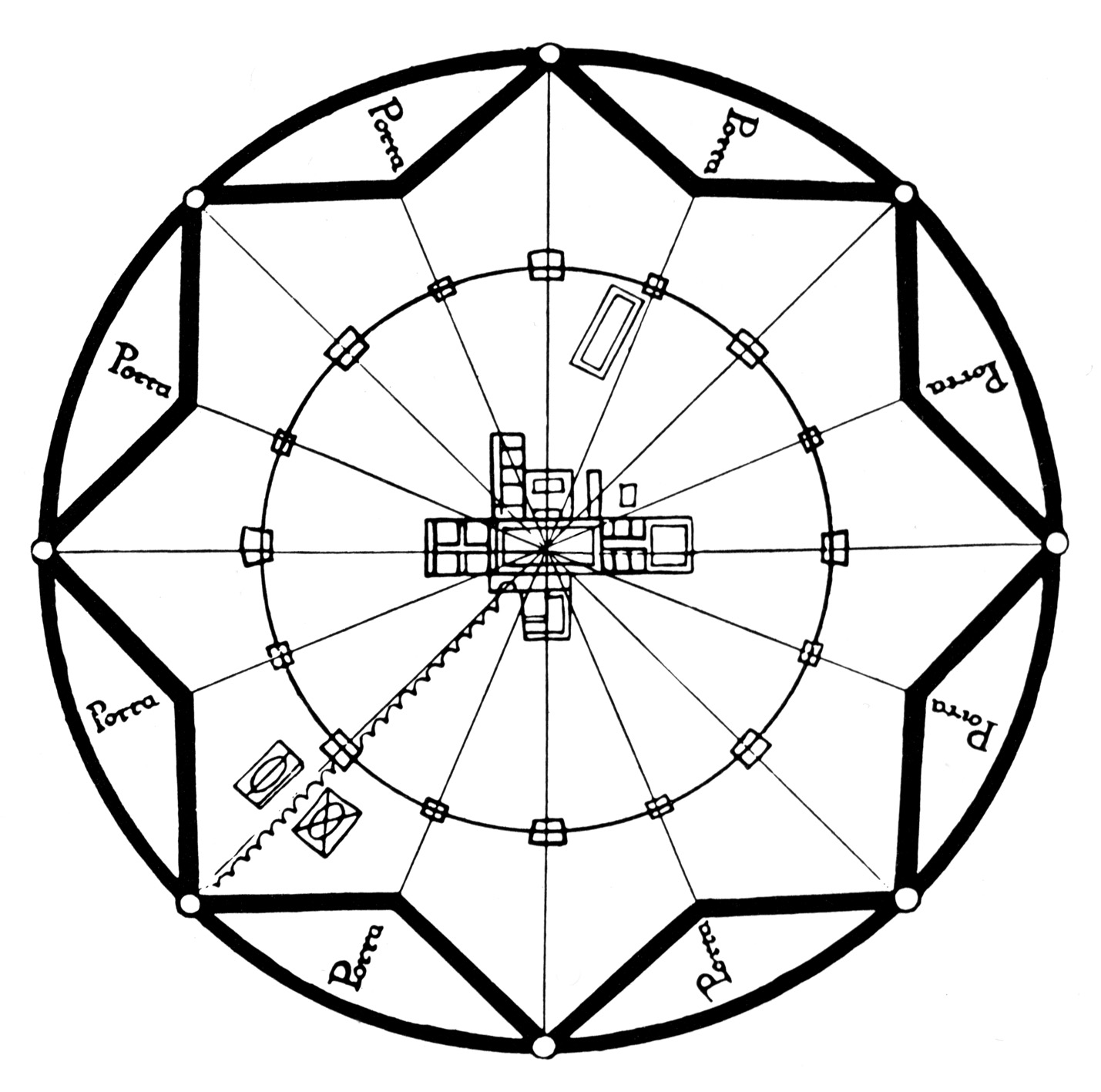
Plan of Sforzinda

Research in town planning under Francesco Sforza did not result in major concrete interventions, but it nevertheless produced a singular project of an ideal city, Sforzinda, the first to be fully theorized. The city was described by Filarete in the Treatise on Architecture and is characterized by an intellectual abstraction that prescinds from the earlier scattered indications of a more practical and empirical approach described by Leon Battista Alberti and other architects, especially in the context of the Urbino Renaissance. The city had a stellar plan, linked to cosmic symbols, and included aggregated buildings without organicity or internal logic, so much so that they were not even linked by a road network, which was instead set to a perfectly radial pattern.

=== Painting ===
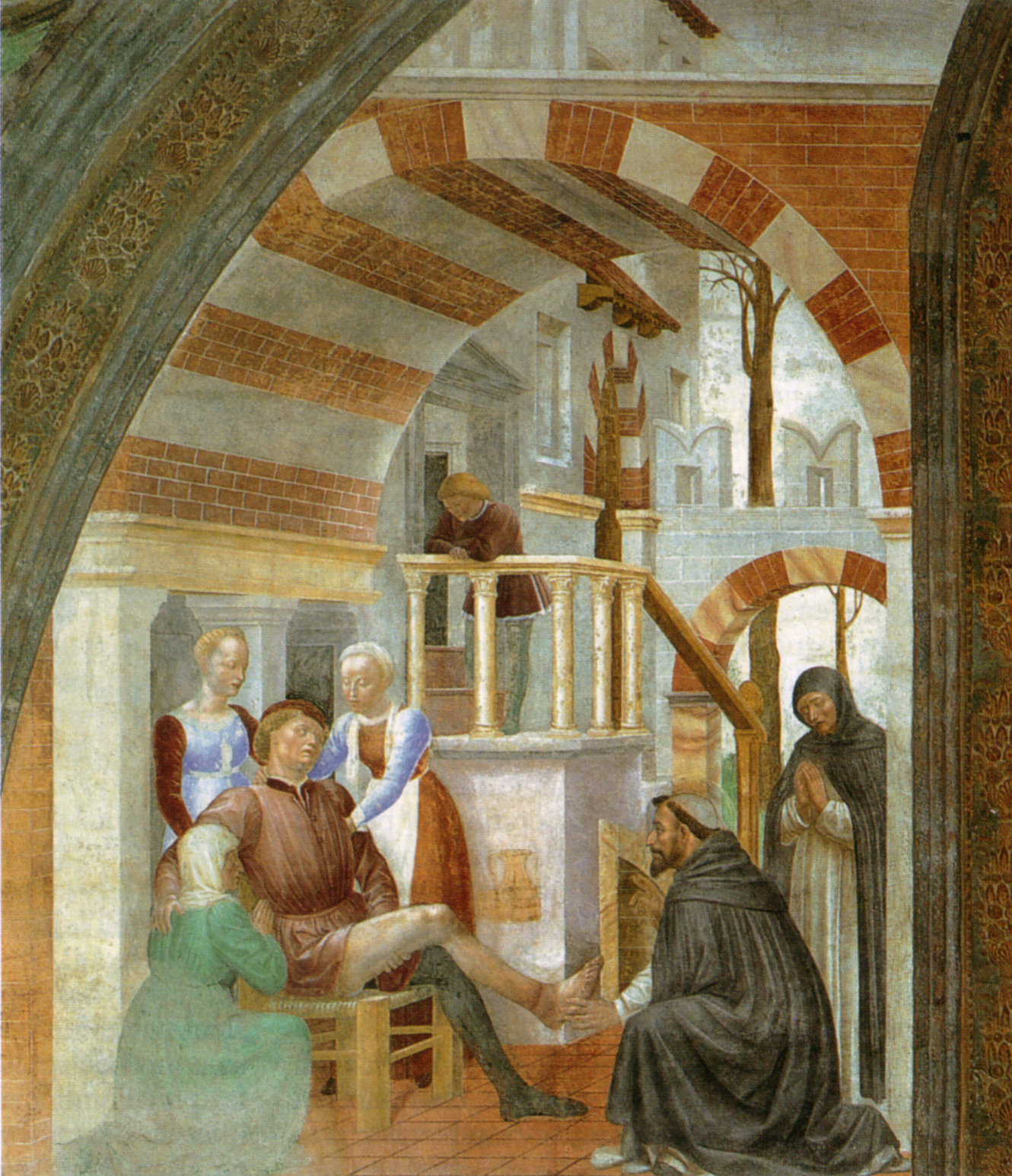
Vincenzo Foppa, Miracle of Narni, Portinari Chapel

One of the most remarkable pictorial undertakings of Francesco Sforza's lordship is precisely related to the Portinari Chapel, frescoed in the upper parts of the walls by Vincenzo Foppa between 1464 and 1468. The decoration, which is in an excellent state of preservation, includes four roundels with Doctors of the Church in the pendentives, eight Busts of Saints in the oculi at the base of the dome, four Stories of St. Peter Martyr in the side walls, and two large frescoes in the triumphal arch and the arch of the counterfacade, respectively an Annunciation and an Assumption of the Virgin.

The painter particularly cared for the relationship with the architecture, seeking an illusive integration between real and painted space. The four scenes of stories of the saint have a common vanishing point, placed outside the scenes (in the center of the wall, on the central mullion of the bifora) on a horizon that falls at the eye level of the characters (according to Leon Battista Alberti's indications). It departs, however, from classical geometric perspective for its original atmospheric sensibility, which softens contours and geometric rigidity: it is the light that makes the scene humanly real. Moreover, a predilection for a simple but effective and comprehensible narrative prevails, set in realistic places with characters resembling everyday types, in line with the Dominicans' preference for didactic narrative.

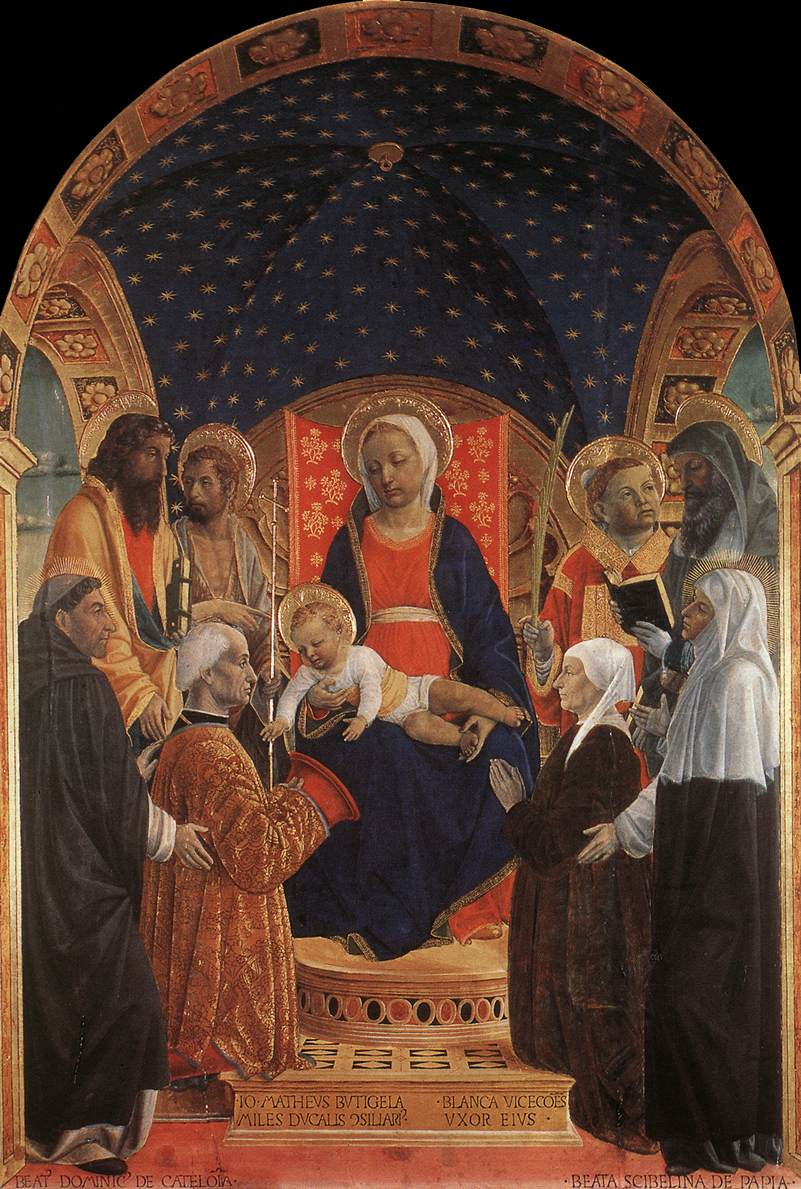
Vincenzo Foppa, Pala Bottigella, Pavia, Pinacoteca Malaspina.

In his later works Foppa also used the medium of perspective in a flexible manner that was in any case secondary to other elements. An example of this is the Pala Bottigella (1480–1484), with a spatial layout derived from Bramante, but saturated with figures, where the accents are placed on the human representation of the various types and on the refraction of light on the various materials. This attention to optical truth, devoid of intellectualism, was one of the most typical features of later Lombard painting, also studied by Leonardo da Vinci.

== Galeazzo Maria Sforza (1466–1476) ==
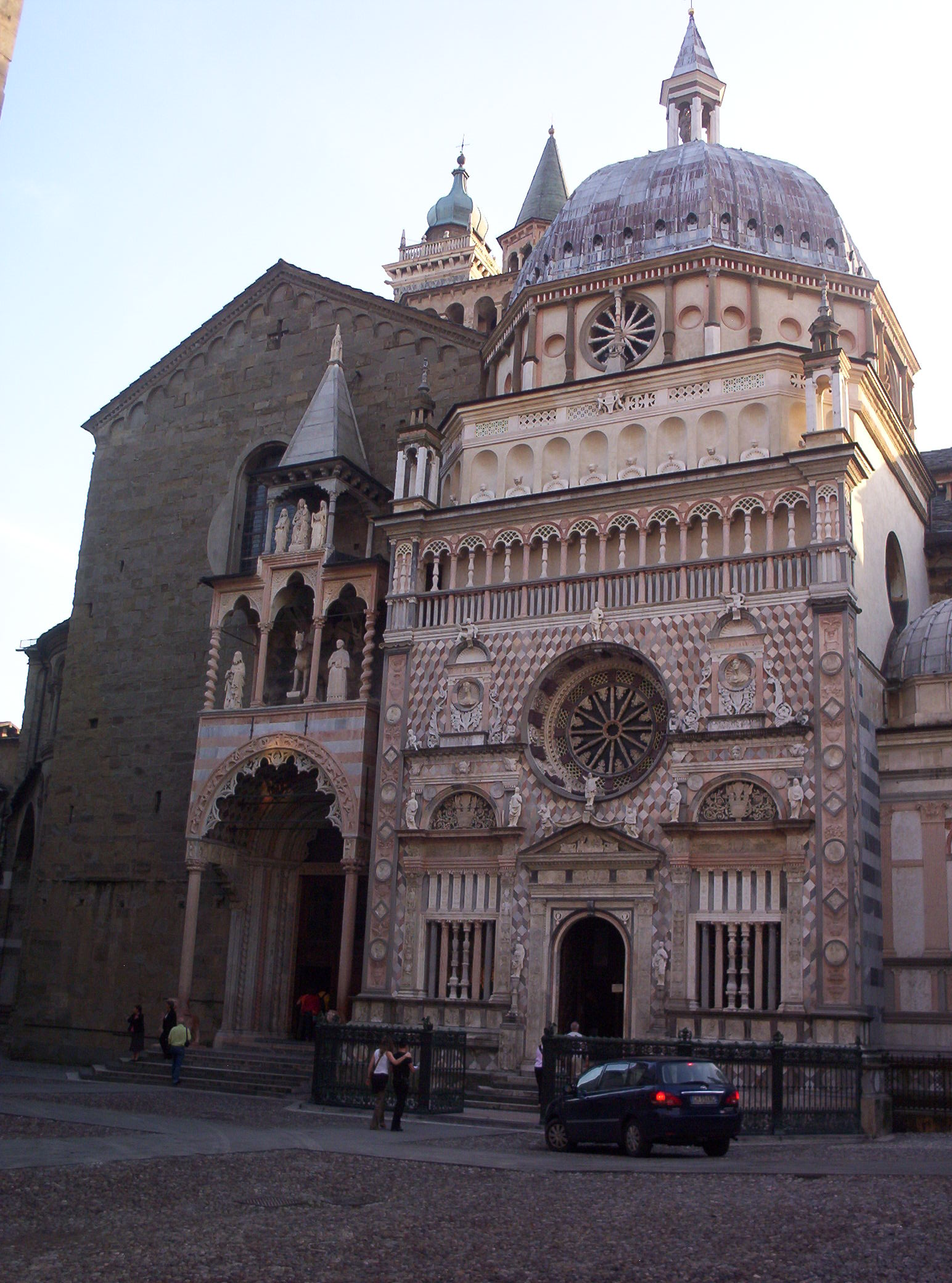
Colleoni Chapel, Bergamo

Galeazzo Maria Sforza was undoubtedly attracted to Gothic-style sumptuousness, and his commissions seemed driven by a desire to do a lot and do it quickly, so his interests did not include encouraging original and up-to-date figurative production, finding it easier to draw from the past. To meet the many demands of the court, large and heterogeneous groups of artists were often formed, such as those who decorated the ducal chapel in the Castello Sforzesco, led by Bonifacio Bembo. In those frescoes, datable to 1473, despite some sober hints at figurative novelties (as in the spatiality of the Annunciation or the plastic setting of the saints), an archaic gilded pastiglia background still remains. This feature is also present in the cycle of frescoes commissioned by Galeazzo Maria Sforza, again to the same group of artists led by Bonifacio Bembo, for the Visconti Castle, and in particular in the Blue Room, where the decoration consists of panels with raised frames in gilded pastiglia.

The artists who worked for Galeazzo Maria Sforza were never "interlocutors" with the patron, but rather docile executors of his wishes.

=== Architecture ===
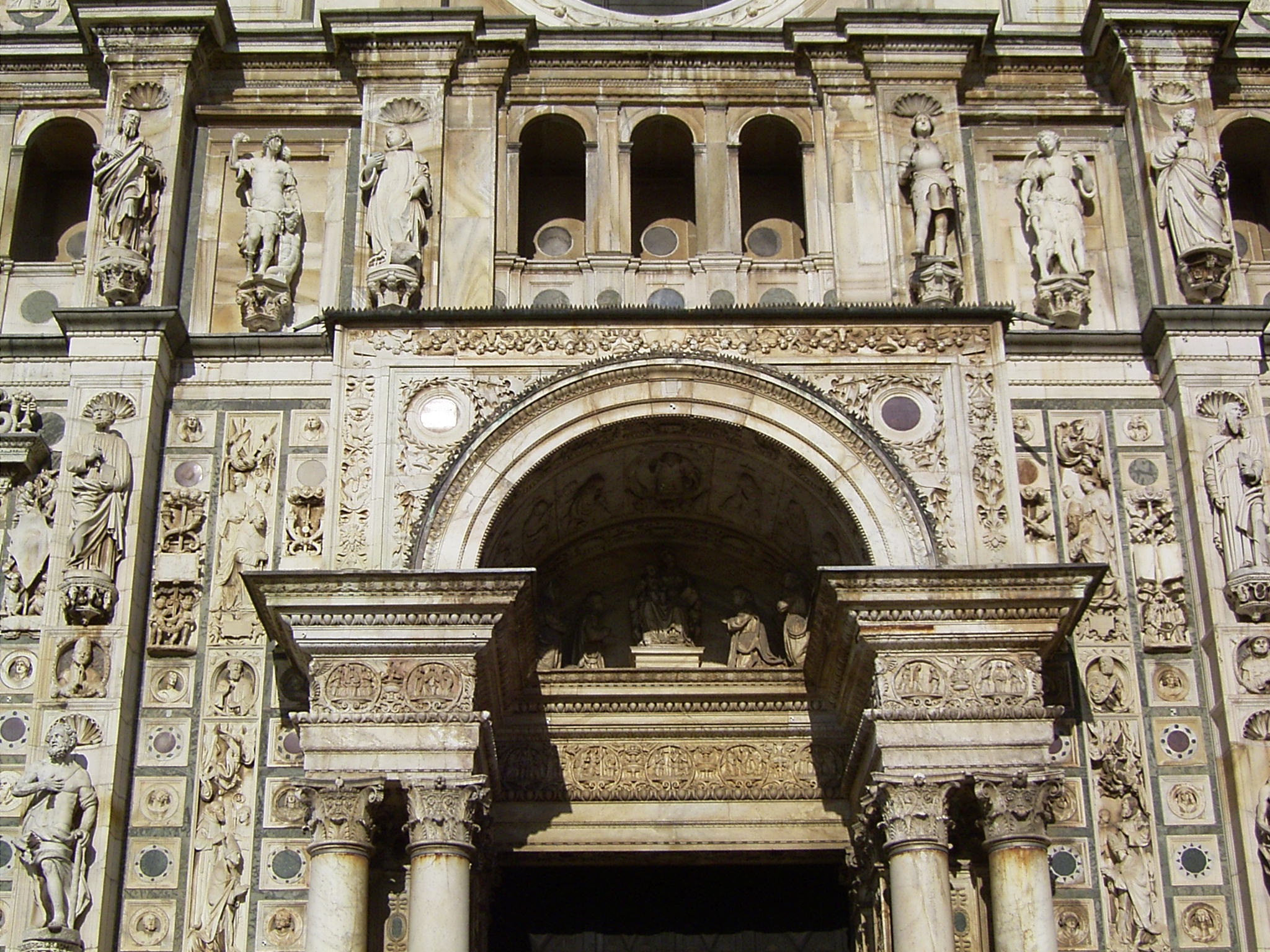
Certosa di Pavia, detail of the facade

The most significant works of the period developed the trend toward covering Renaissance architecture with exuberant decoration, as had already happened in part at the Ospedale Maggiore, with a crescendo that had a first culmination in the Colleoni Chapel in Bergamo (1470–1476) and a second in the façade of the Certosa di Pavia (from 1491), both by Giovanni Antonio Amadeo along with others.

The Colleoni Chapel was built as a mausoleum for the condottiero Bartolomeo Colleoni, with a layout that again echoed Brunelleschi's Sacrestia Vecchia. The plan is square, surmounted by a segmented dome with octagonal drum and scarsella with the altar, also covered by a small dome. However, the structural clarity was enriched with pictorial motifs, especially on the facade, with the use of a white/pink/purple trichromy and the lozenge motif.

The Certosa di Pavia, started in 1396 by Gian Galeazzo Visconti, was resumed only in the mid-15th century, following in a sense the fortunes of the Milanese ducal family, with long periods of stagnation and abrupt accelerations, welcoming the gradually more modern ideas of the artistic scene. It was mainly taken care of by Guiniforte and Giovanni Solari, who kept the original design (Latin cross plan with three naves and simple brick masonry), enriching only the apse part with a trefoil closure that is also repeated in the arms of the transepts. The two cloisters with round arches, decorated with exuberant terracotta ferrules, hark back to the Ospedale Maggiore, while the interior cites the Milan Cathedral.

=== Sculpture ===
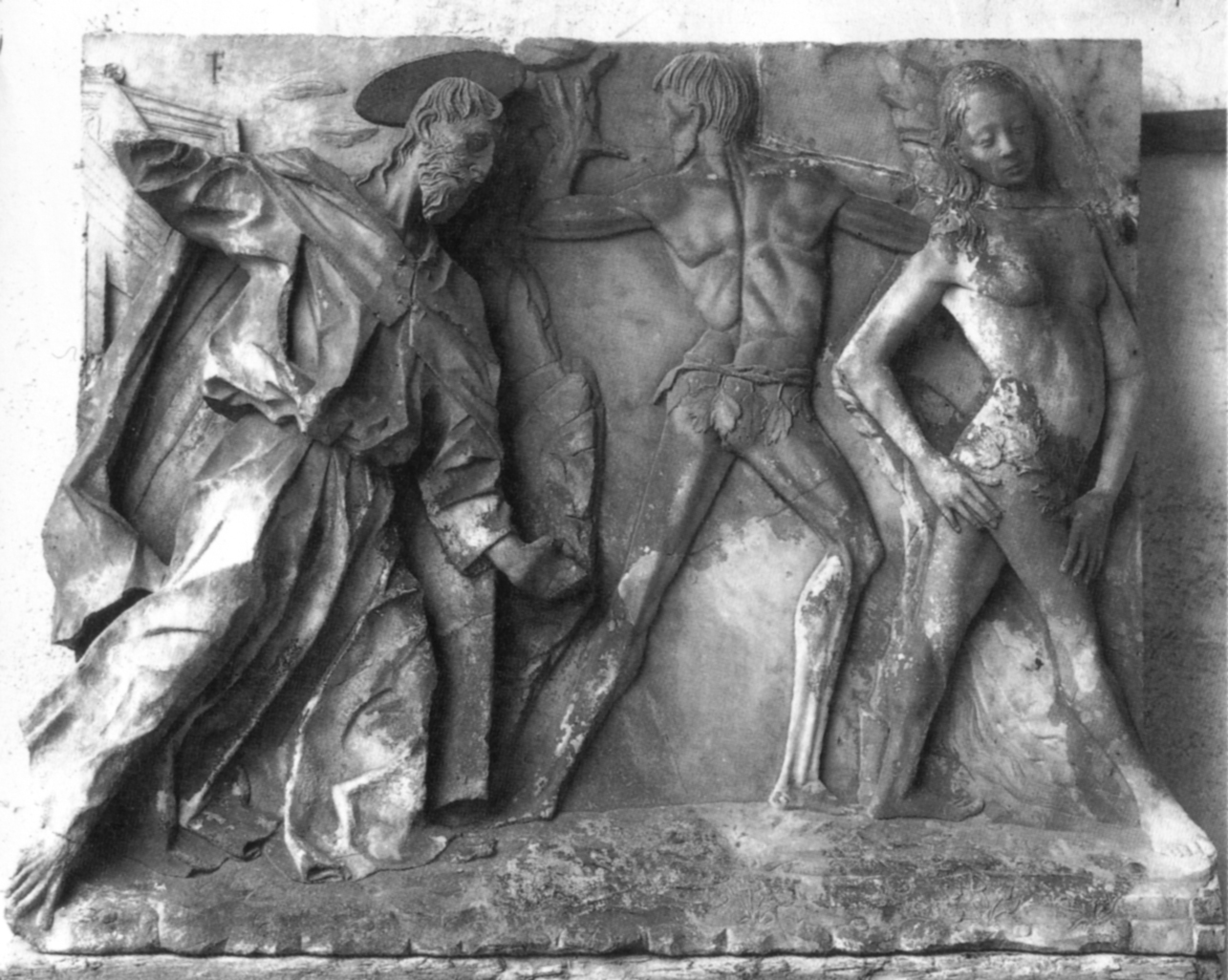
Cristoforo Mantegazza, Expulsion of the progenitors.

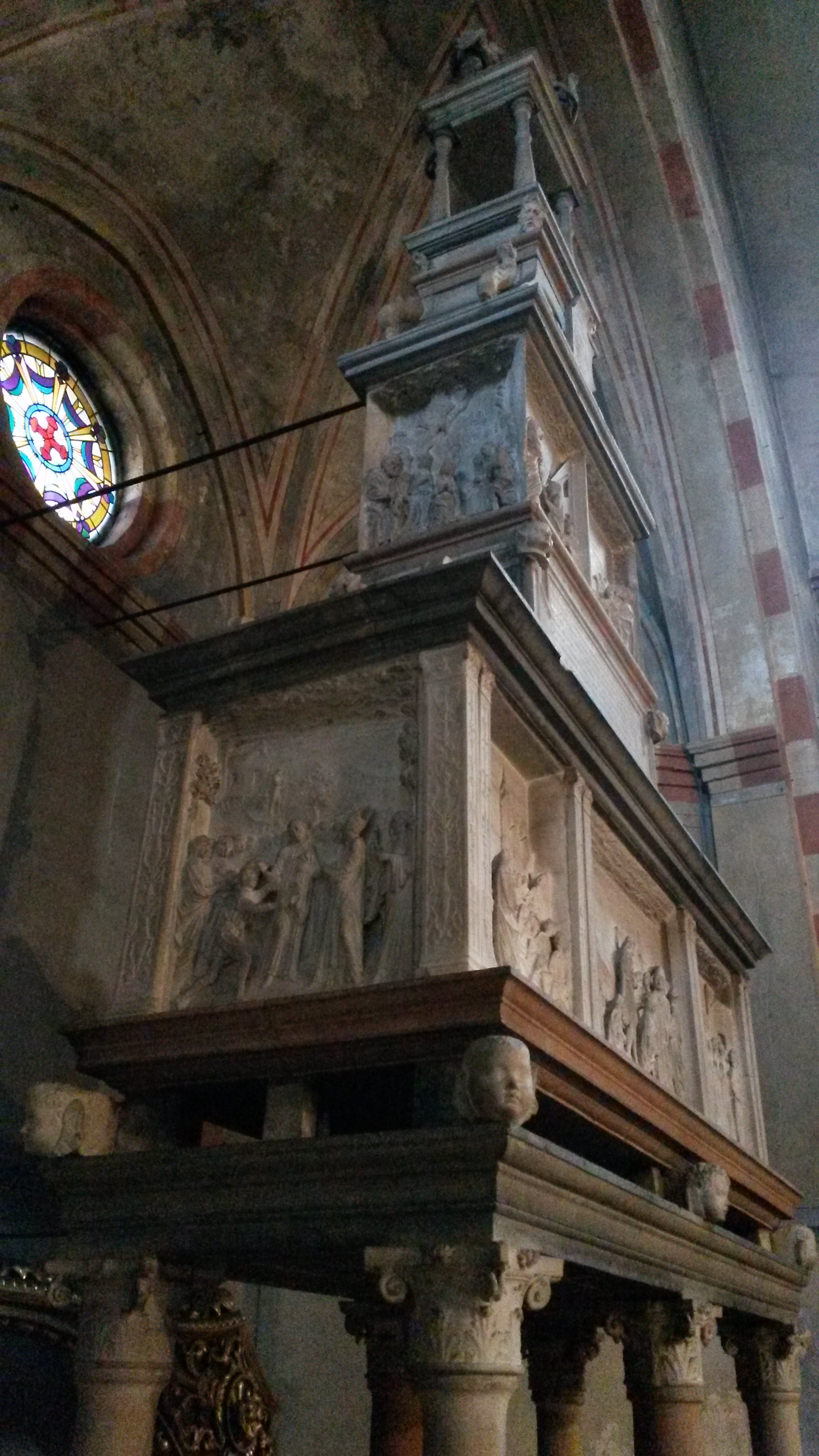
Giovanni Antonio Amadeo, ark of Saint Lanfranco Beccari, Pavia, San Lanfranco (1489).

In sculpture, the most significant building site of the period was the Certosa di Pavia. The numerous sculptors engaged in the decoration of the facade, not all of whom have been identified, were subject to obvious Ferrara and Bramante influences. For example, in the relief of the Expulsion of the progenitors (c. 1475) attributed to Cristoforo Mantegazza, there is a graphic sign, sharp angles, unnatural and unbalanced deviations of the figures, and violent chiaroscuro, with results of great expressiveness and originality. In Giovanni Antonio Amadeo's Resurrection of Lazarus (c. 1474), on the other hand, the setting emphasizes more the depth of architecture in perspective, with more composed figures albeit etched by abrupt contours.

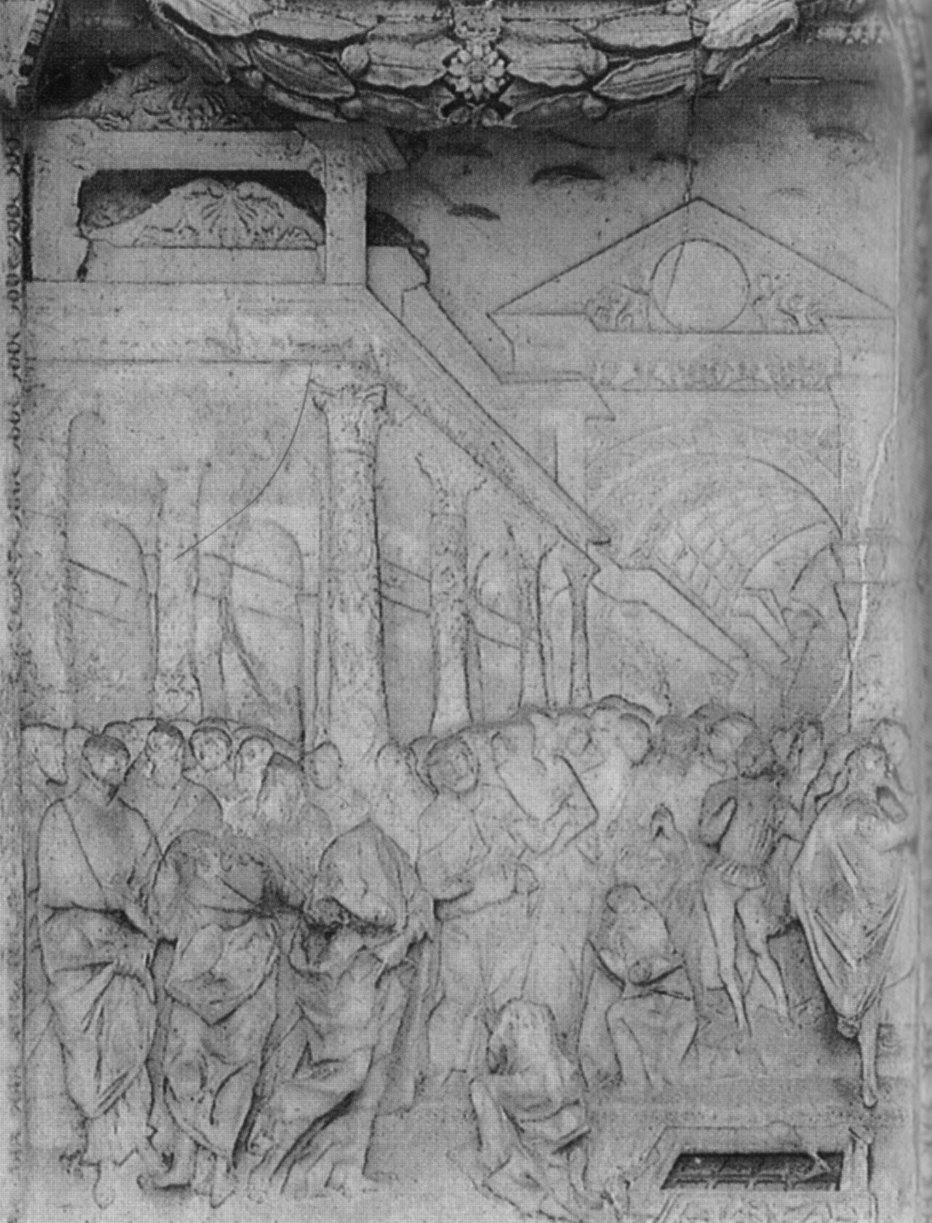
Giovanni Antonio Amadeo, Resurrection of Lazarus

== Ludovico il Moro (1480–1500) ==
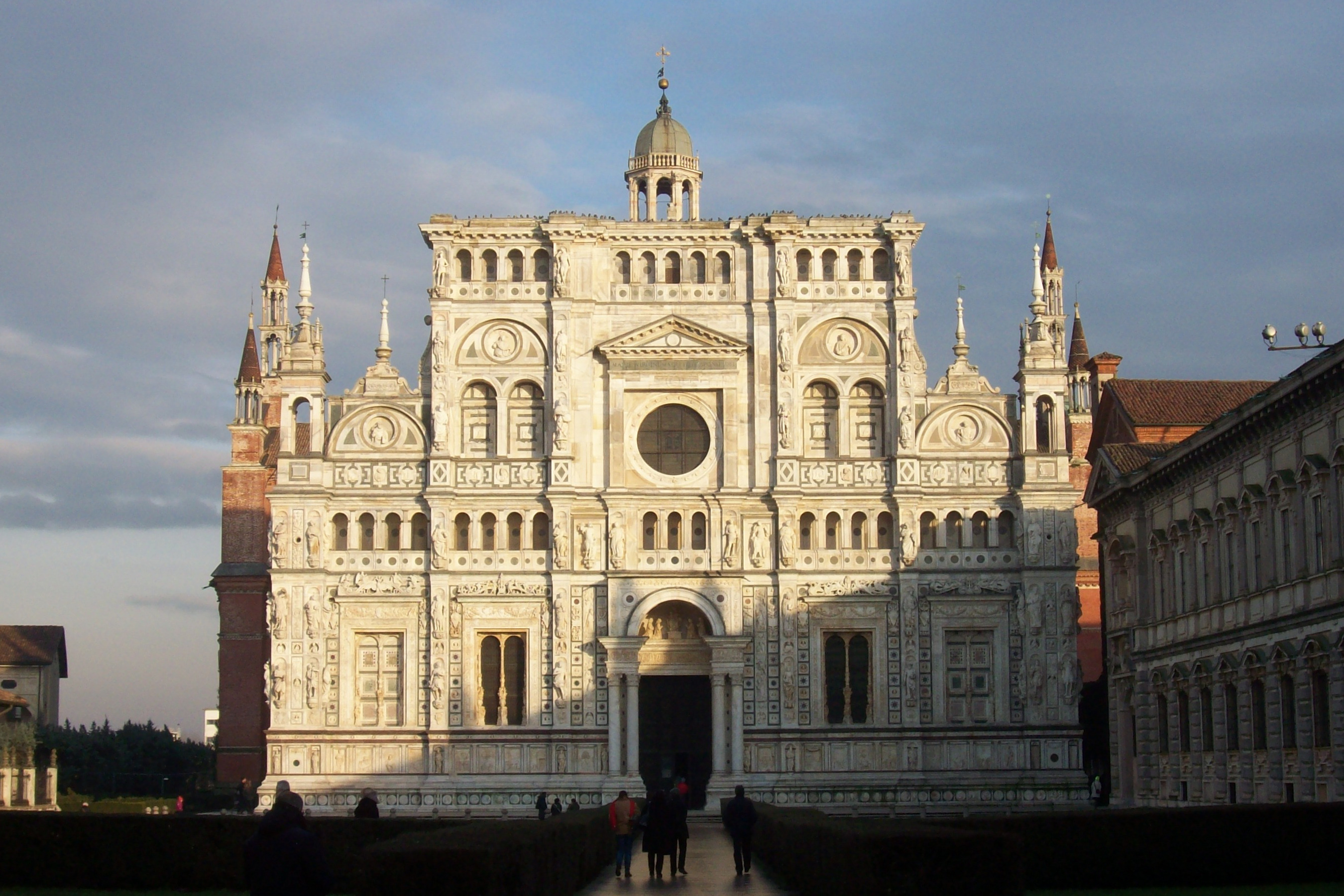
Certosa di Pavia, facade

At the time of Ludovico il Moro, in the last two decades of the 15th century, artistic production in the Milanese duchy progressed between continuity and innovation. The tendency toward pomp and ostentation reached its peak, especially at special court celebrations.

With the arrival of the two great masters Donato Bramante (from 1477) and Leonardo da Vinci (from 1482), coming from Urbino and Florence, respectively, Lombard culture underwent a sharp turn in the Renaissance direction, albeit without conspicuous ruptures, due to a terrain that was by then ready to absorb novelties as a result of the innovations of the previous period. The two thus managed to integrate perfectly into the Lombard court and, at the same time, to renew the relationship between artist and patron, now based on lively and fruitful exchanges.

Art in the duchy during this period recorded the mutual influences between Lombard artists and the two foreign innovators, often working in parallel or at cross paths.

=== Architecture ===
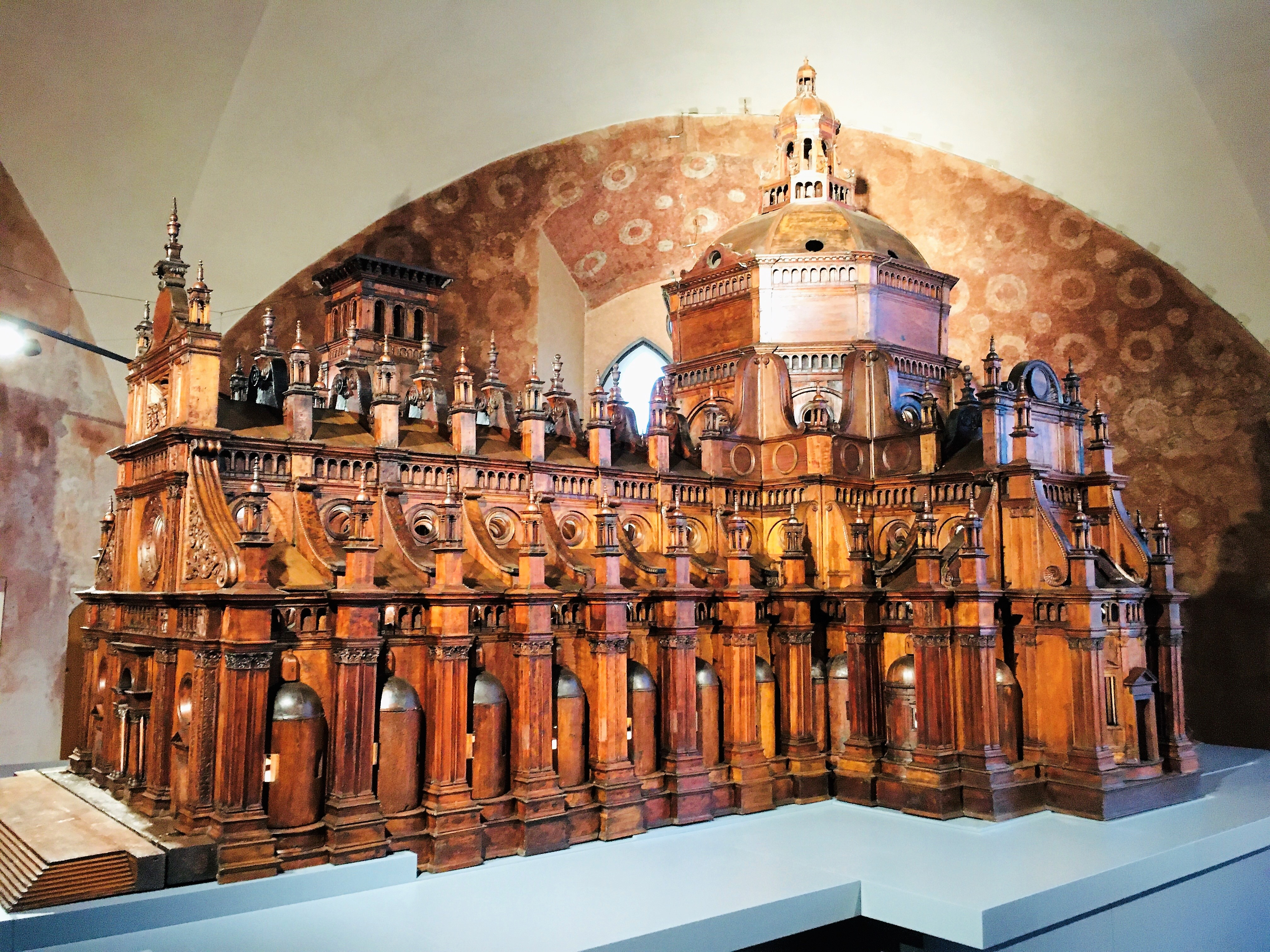
Wooden model of Pavia Cathedral (1497), Pavia, Pinacoteca Malaspina.

Compared to his predecessor, Ludovico was concerned about reviving the great architectural worksites, partly due to the new awareness of their political significance linked to the fame of the city and, by extension, of its prince. Among the most important works, in which the fruitful exchanges between masters were consummated, were essentially the Pavia Cathedral (of which a wooden model dating from 1497 is still preserved), the castle and square of Vigevano, and the tiburium of the Milan Cathedral. Studies on centrally planned buildings enlivened Bramante's research and fascinated Leonardo, filling pages of his codices with solutions of increasing complexity.

Sometimes a more traditional style continued to be practiced, made up of a decorative exuberance set on Renaissance lines. The main work of this style was the facade of the Certosa di Pavia, which was executed starting in 1491 by Giovanni Antonio Amadeo, who made it to the first cornice, and was completed by Benedetto Briosco. The rather rigid layout, with two overlapping quadrangular bands, is enlivened by vertical pilasters, openings of various shapes, small loggias and, above all, a multitude of reliefs and polychrome marble motifs. Not much differently, Amadeo made for Palazzo Bottigella, where the space between the terracotta architectural lines is (literally) filled with paintings depicting coats of arms, plant motifs, candelabras, fantastic figures and animals.

==== Bramante in Lombardy ====
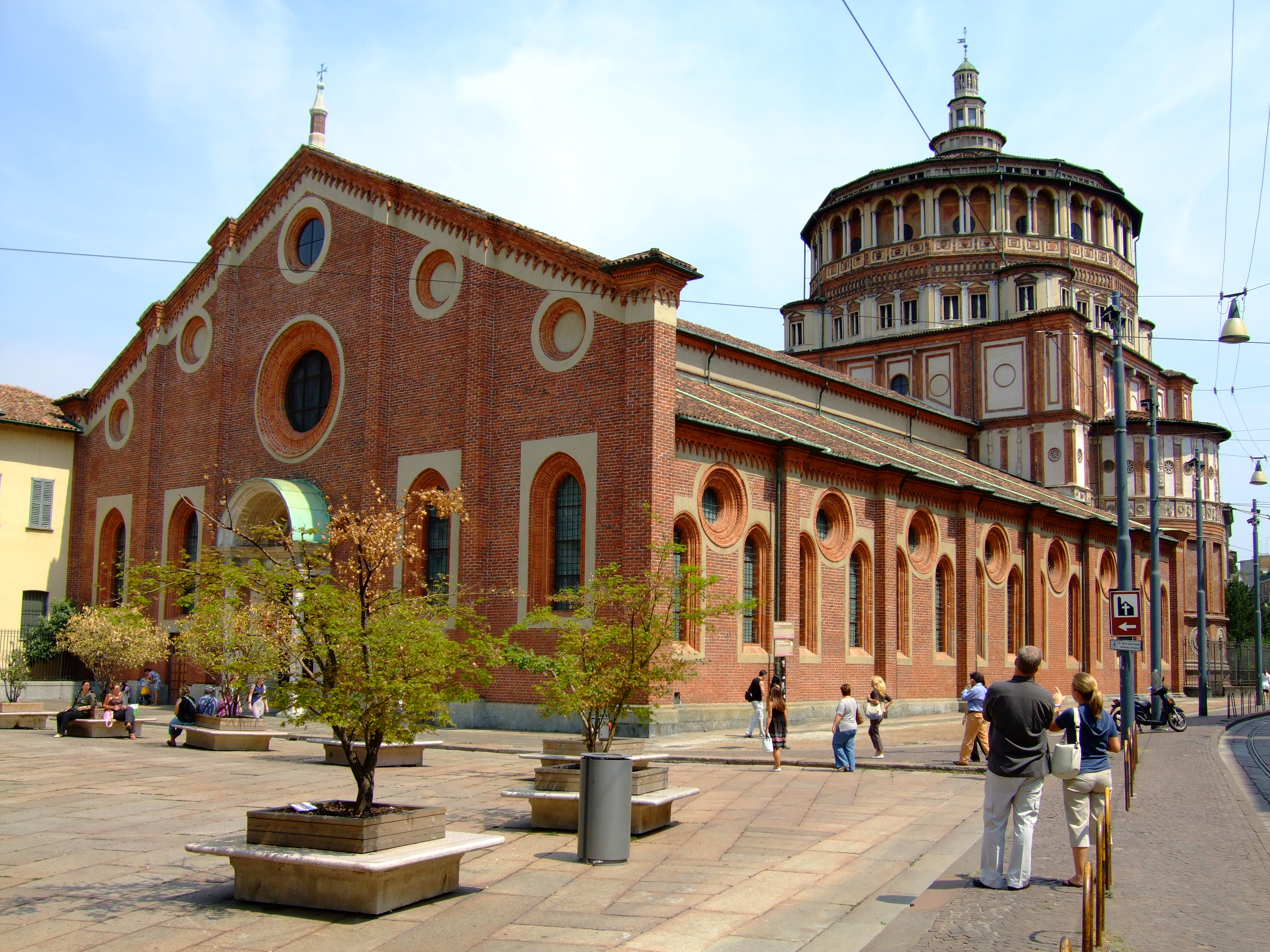
Santa Maria delle Grazie

Among the first works in which Bramante ventured for Ludovico il Moro was the reconstruction of the church of Santa Maria presso San Satiro (c. 1479–1482), in which the problem of centralized space was already emerging. A longitudinal body with three naves was designed, with equal width between the nave and transept arms, both covered by mighty barrel vaults with painted coffers that evoked Alberti's model of Sant'Andrea. The intersection of the arms features a dome, an ever-present Bramantean motif, but the harmony of the whole was jeopardized by the insufficient breadth of the apex, which, in the impossibility of extending it, was illusionistically "lengthened" by constructing a mock stucco vanishing point in a space less than a meter deep, complete with an illusory coffered vault.

The other major project to which Bramante devoted himself was the reconstruction of the tribune of Santa Maria delle Grazie, which was transformed despite the fact that work on the complex conducted by Guiniforte Solari had been completed just ten years before: Il Moro wished to give a more monumental appearance to the Dominican basilica, to make it the burial place of his own family. The naves built by Solari, immersed in half-light, were illuminated by the monumental tribune at the intersection of the arms, covered by a hemispherical dome. Bramante also added two large side apses and a third, beyond the choir, in axis with the naves. The orderly arrangement of spaces is also reflected on the exterior in an interlocking pattern of volumes that culminates in the tiburium that covers the dome, with a loggia that harkens back to the motifs of early Christian and Lombard Romanesque architecture.

Concordantly attributed to Bramante is the planimetric design of the imposing Pavia Cathedral (of which the wooden model from 1497 is also preserved), based on the grafting of an octagonal domed core with a longitudinal body with three naves, as in the cathedral of Santa Maria del Fiore in Florence or in the Sanctuary of the Holy House of Loreto, then under construction and with which Bramante was probably familiar. The crypt (finished in 1492) and the basement part of the apse area of the building are attributed to Bramante's design, in addition to the general plan scheme.

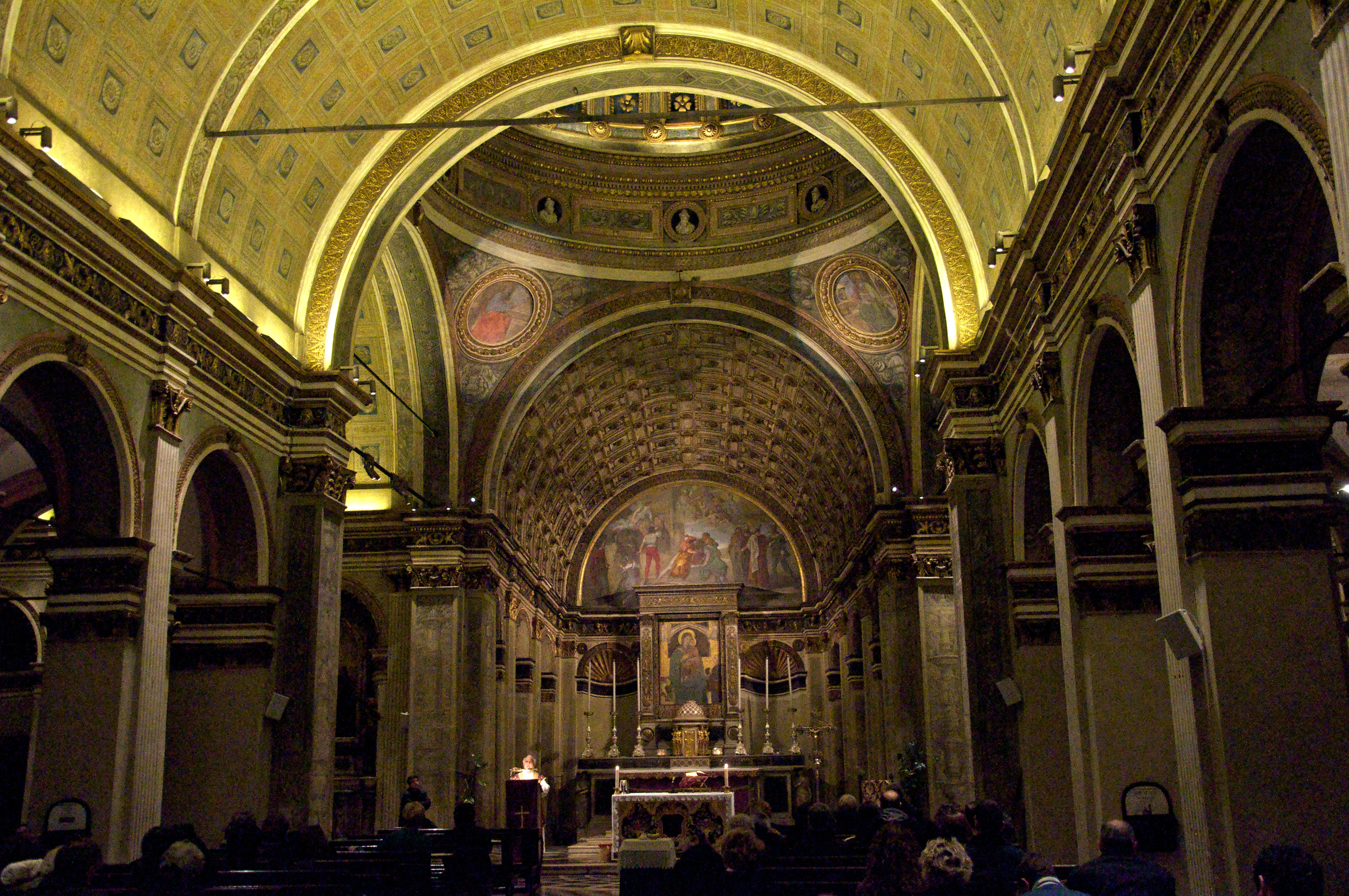
Interior of Santa Maria presso San Satiro

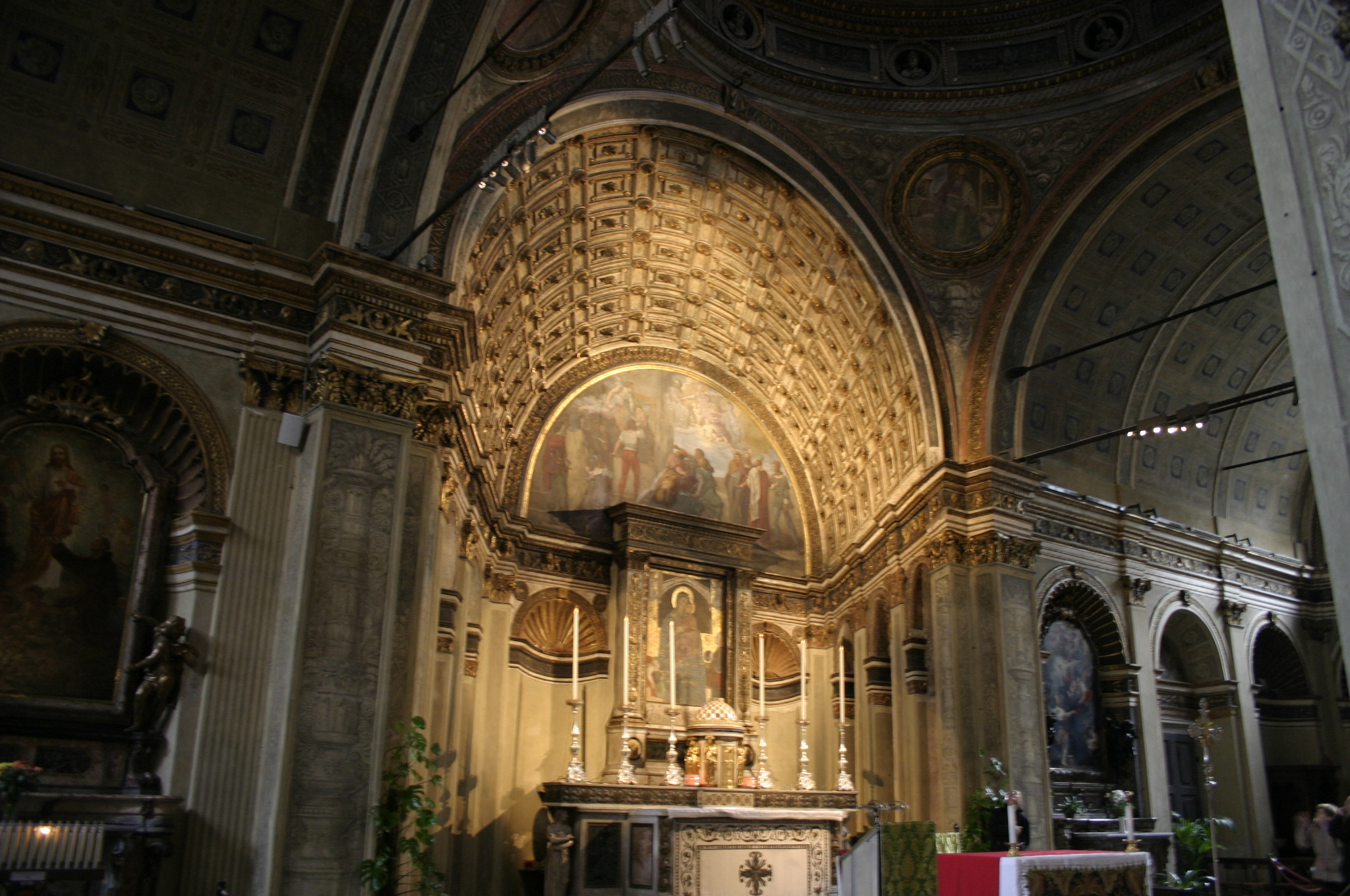
Foreshortened side view of the false apse of San Satiro

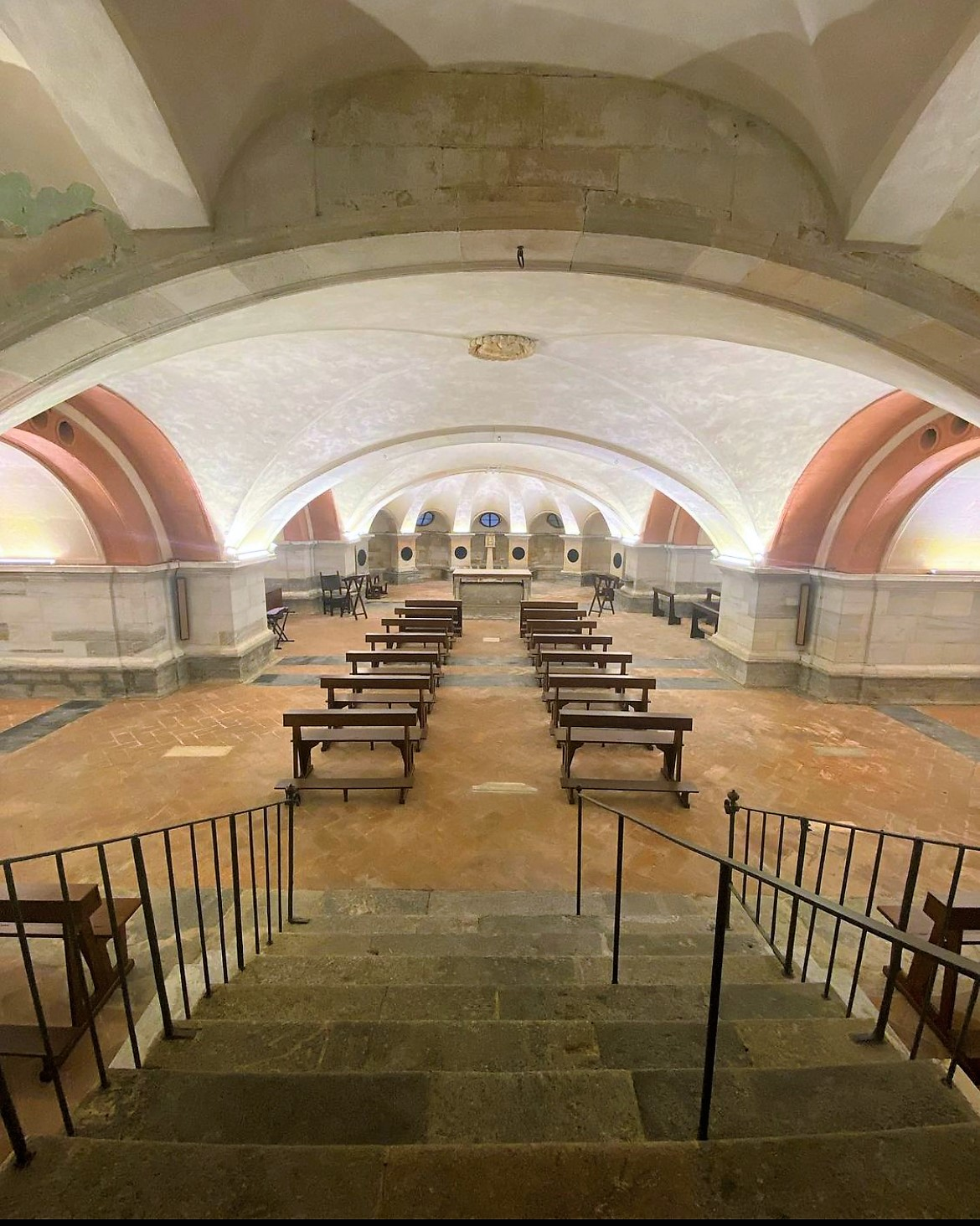
Crypt of Pavia Cathedral (1492)

=== Painting ===
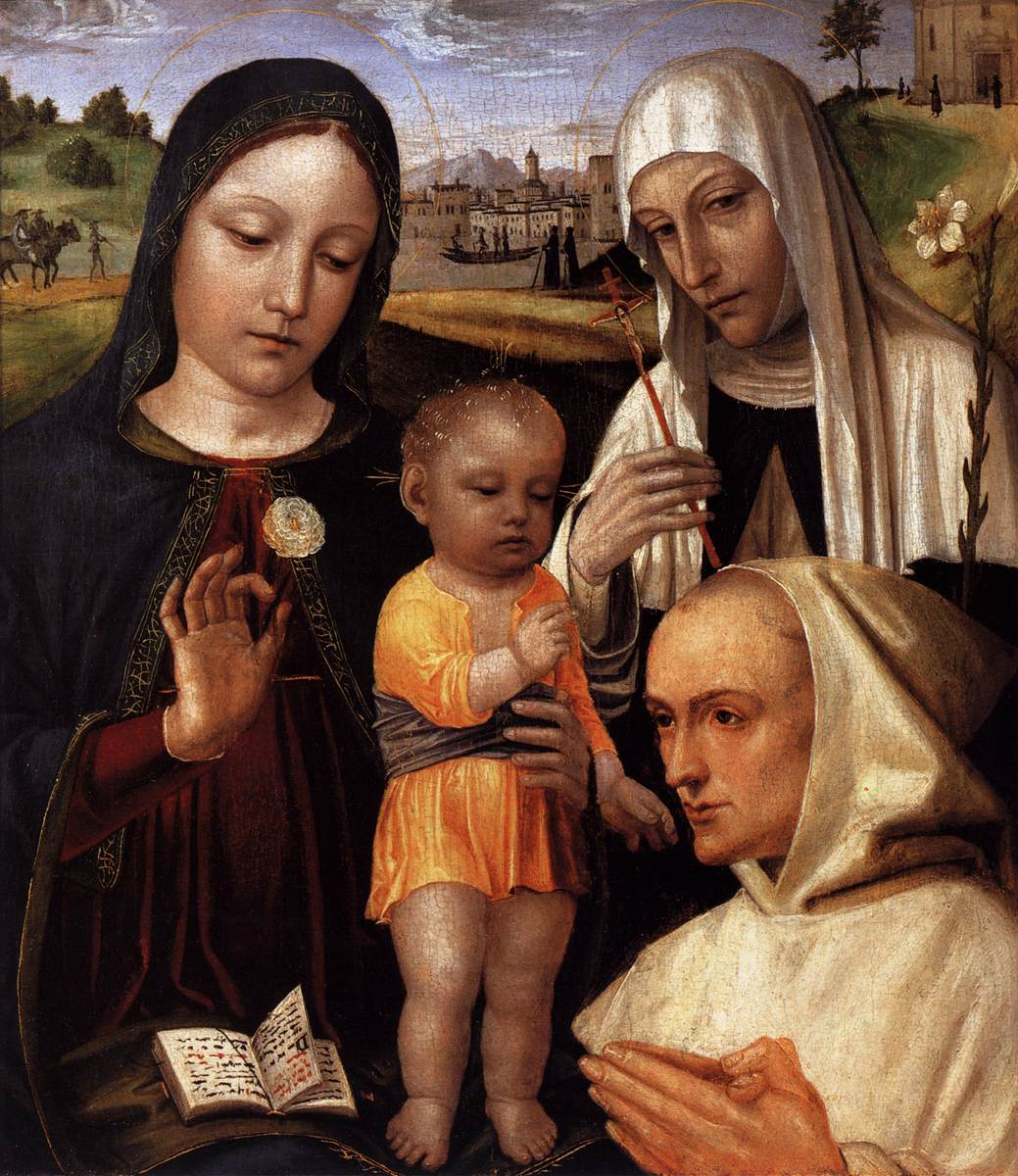
Bergognone, Madonna del certosino

On the occasion of his wedding to Beatrice d'Este, Ludovico had the Sala della Balla in the Castello Sforzesco decorated, calling upon all the Lombard masters available on the square. Alongside masters such as Bernardino Butinone and Bernardo Zenale thus arrived in Milan a crowd of masters of medium and small caliber, almost entirely unknown to art-historical studies, who were required to work side by side to quickly set up a lavish apparatus, rich in political significance, but with wide qualitative fluctuations that seemed the least of the patron's concerns.

==== Bergognone ====
Between 1488 and 1495 the Lombard painter Bergognone was involved in the decoration of the Certosa di Pavia. His production was inspired by Vincenzo Foppa, but also shows strong Flemish accents, probably filtered through Ligurian contacts. This feature was particularly evident in the small-format panels intended for the devotion of the monks in the cells, such as the so-called Madonna del certosino (1488–1490), where luminous values prevail in a quiet and somewhat dull color scheme. Later the artist abandoned nacreous tones, accentuating chiaroscuro passages and adhering to the innovations introduced by Leonardo and Bramante. In the Mystic Marriage of Saint Catherine (c. 1490) the scenic construction is linked to a skillful use of perspective with a lowered point of view, but there remain echoes of courtly elegance in the undulating contours of the figures, although purified and simplified.

==== Butinone and Zenale ====
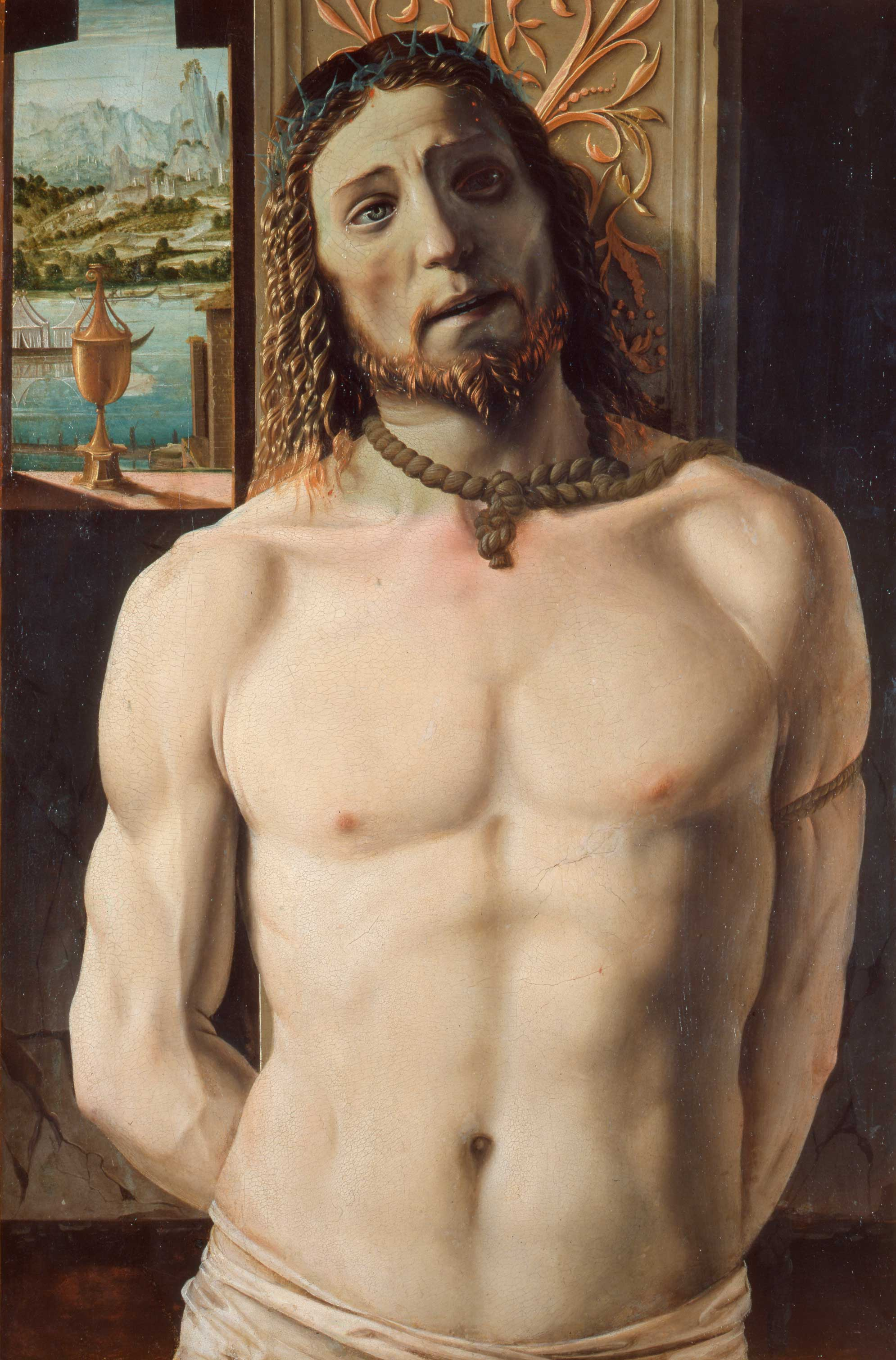
Bramante, Christ at the Column (c. 1480–1490)

Lombard workshops of the period were generally organized according to collective work practices and were gradually affected by the most modern innovations, which were translated into hybrids with local traditions. An excellent example is that of the association between Bernardino Butinone and Bernardo Zenale of Treviglio, who cooperated respectively as master and pupil (but perhaps also simply as associated artists) in works on important commissions. The Polyptych of St. Martin (1481–1485), for the church of San Martino in Treviglio, shows an equal division of labor, with a homogenization of personal styles toward a harmonious result. The perspective layout, inspired by Vincenzo Foppa, is also affected by the illusionism between frame and painted architecture derived from Mantegna's San Zeno Altarpiece (1457–1459), with the faux portico where figures are neatly staggered. Perspective, however, is linked to optical gimmicks rather than strict geometric construction, with convergence toward a single vanishing point (placed in the center of the central panel of san Martino), but without exact proportionality of the glimpses into depth. Elements such as garlands or railings enhance the foreground and the figures behind, while its use of gilded decorations is linked to a courtly Gothic heritage.

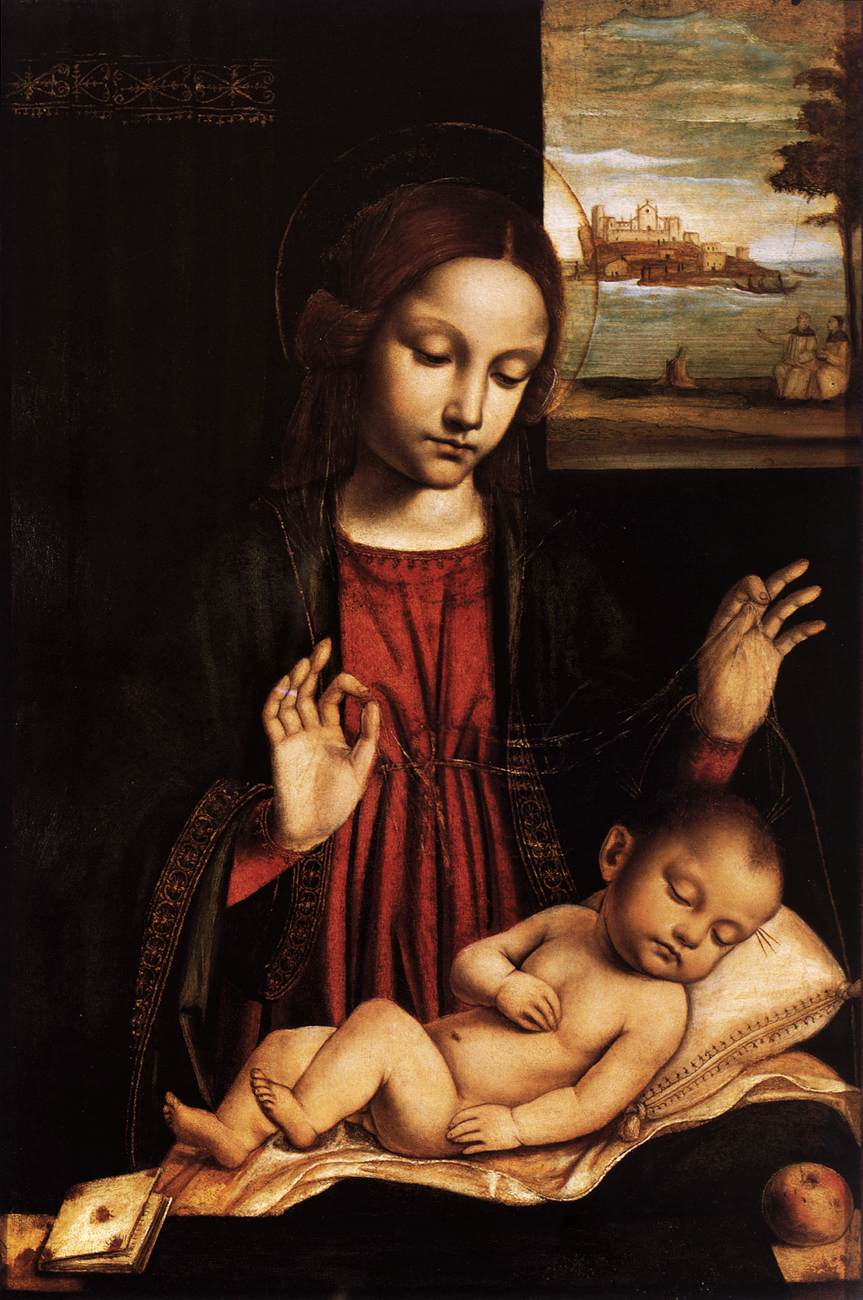
Bergognone, Madonna of the Veil

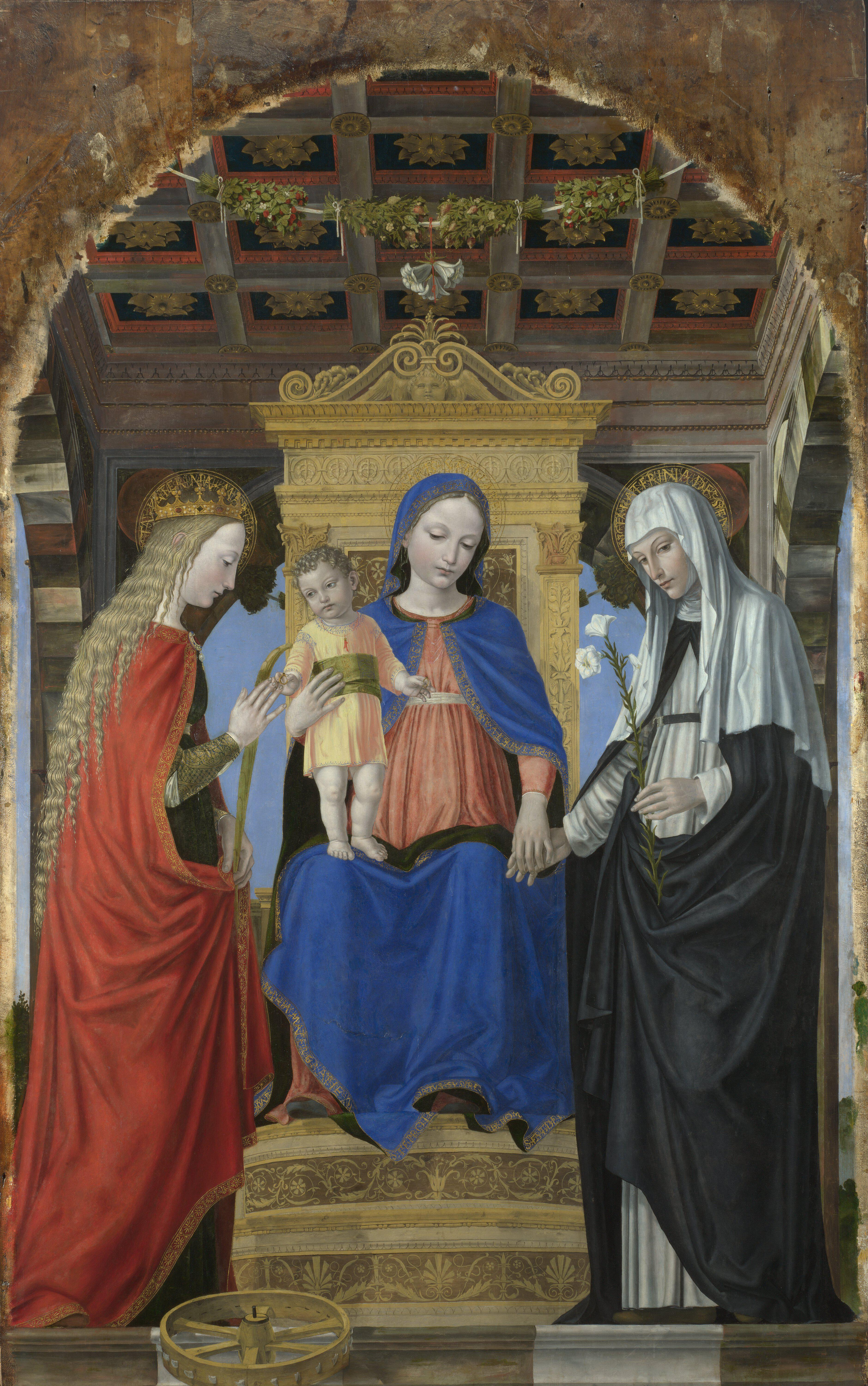
Bergognone, Mystic Marriage of St. Catherine of Alexandria

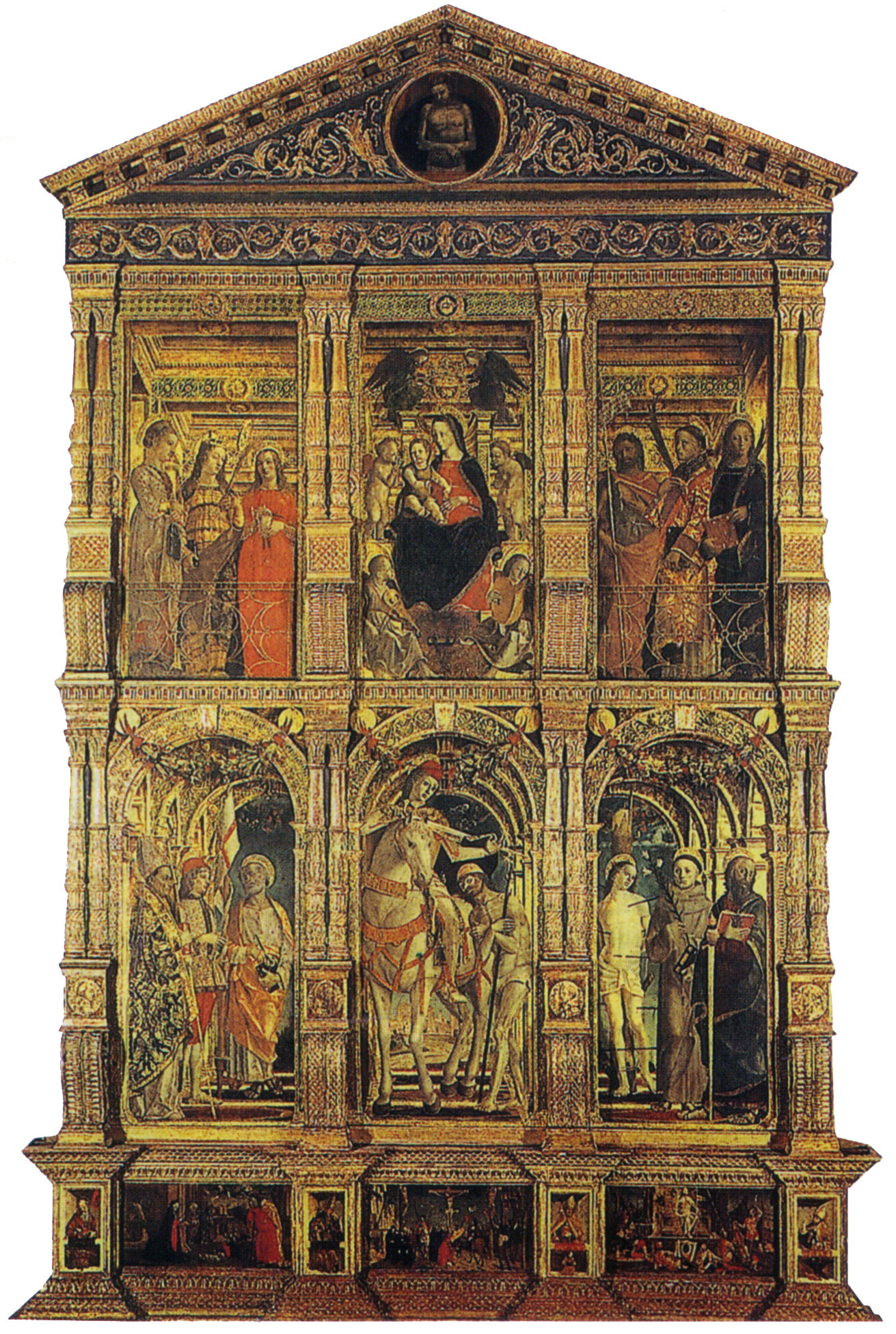
Butinone and Zenale, Polyptych of St. Martin

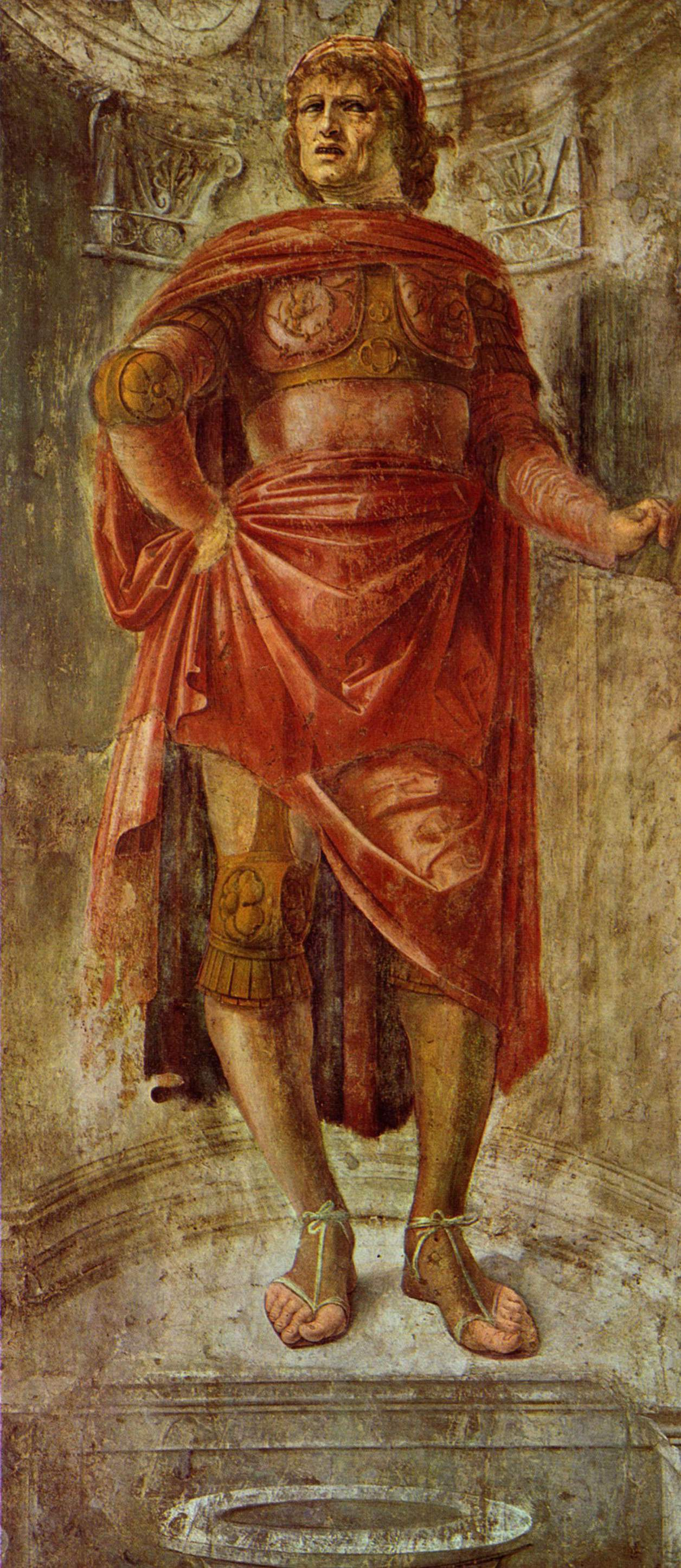
Bramante, Men-at-Arms of the House of Visconti-Panigarola, 1486–87

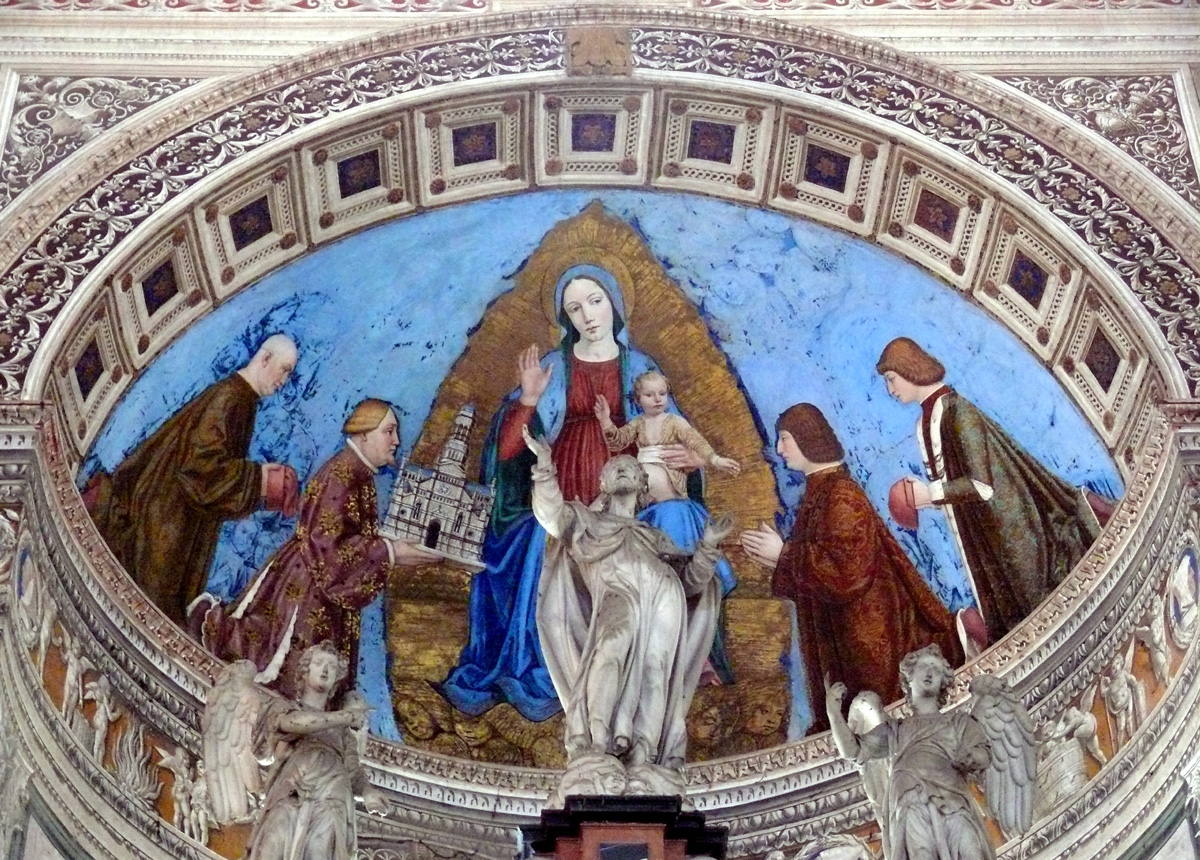
Bergognone, Gian Galeazzo Visconti donates the Certosa di Pavia to the Virgin Mary

==== Bramante, the painter ====
Bramante was also a painter, the author in Milan of a series of humanistic-themed frescoes on the Illustrious Men, the so-called Men-at-Arms of the House of Visconti-Panigarola, as well as a famous panel with Christ at the Column (c. 1480–1490). In the latter, references to Urbino culture are evident, with the figure of the suffering Redeemer thrust into the foreground, almost in direct contact with the viewer, with a classical modeling in the nude torso and with clear Flemish reminiscences, both in the landscape and in the meticulous rendering of details and their luminous reflections, especially in the red and blue glows of the hair and beard.

==== Leonardo da Vinci's first stay ====
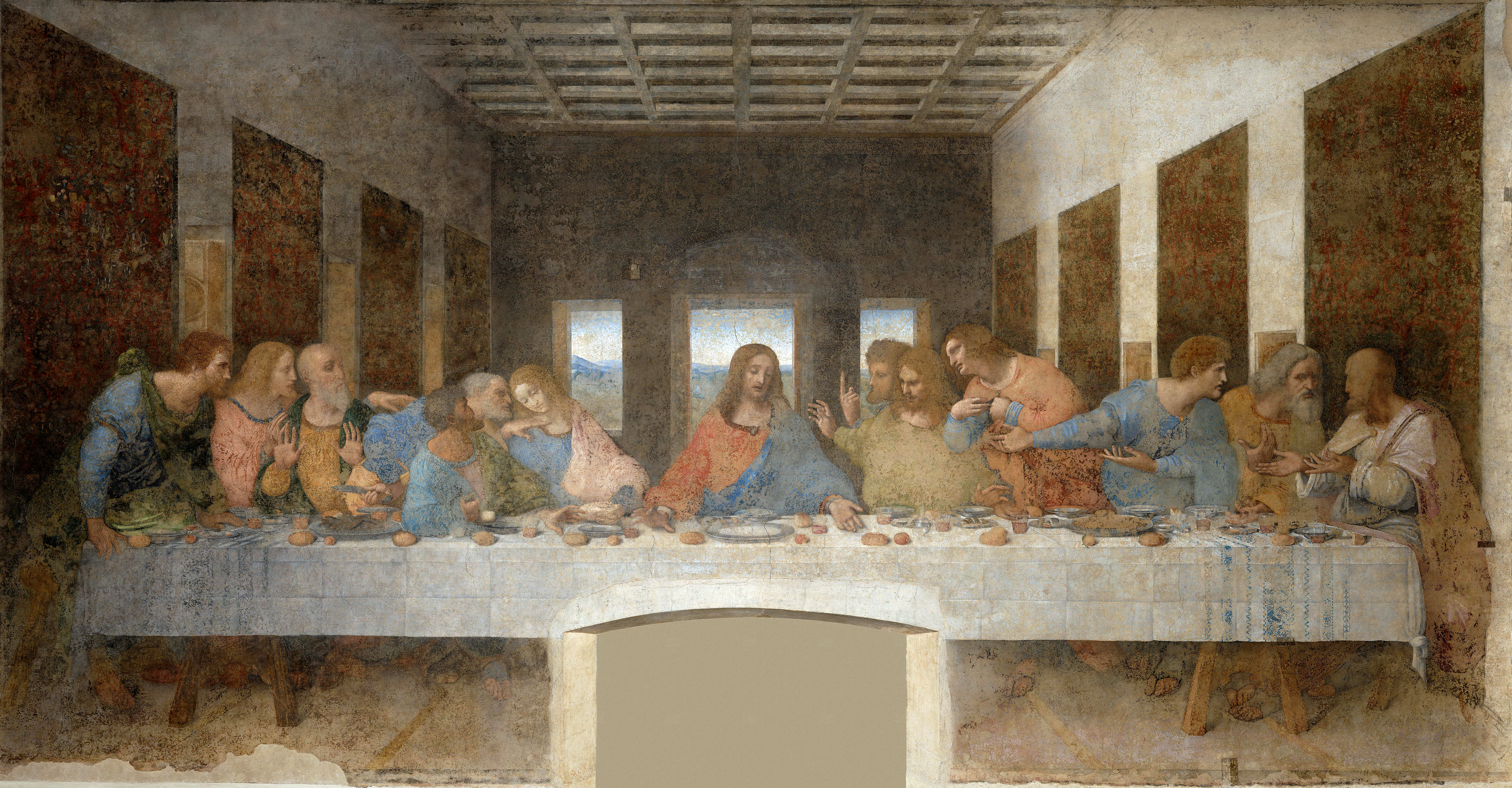
Leonardo, The Last Supper (1494–1497)

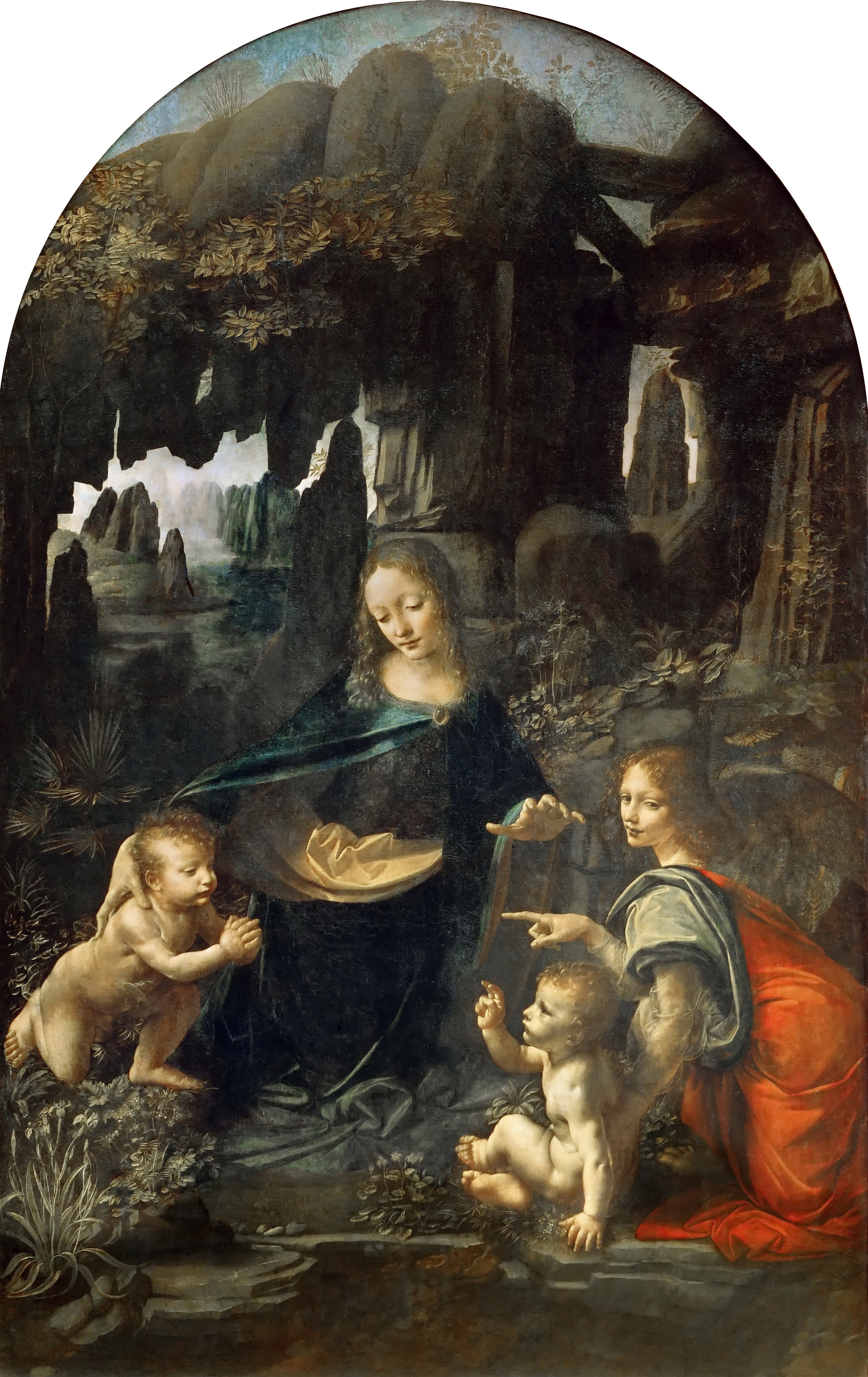
Leonardo, Virgin of the Rocks, first version (1483–1486)

Like Bramante, Leonardo da Vinci was also attracted to Lombardy by the job opportunities offered by the policy of energetic expansion promoted by the Sforza family. In a famous self-presentation letter of 1482, the artist enumerated his skills in ten points, ranging from military and civil engineering, hydraulics to music and art (mentioned last, to be exercised "in time of peace").

At first, however, Leonardo found no response to his overtures to the Duke, devoting himself to the cultivation of his own scientific interests (numerous codices date from this fruitful period) and receiving a first major commission from a confraternity, which in 1483 asked him and his brothers Giovanni Ambrogio and Cristoforo de Predis, who were his hosts, for a triptych to be displayed on their altar in the destroyed church of San Francesco Grande. Leonardo painted the central panel with the Virgin of the Rocks, a work of great originality in which the figures are set in a pyramid shape, with a strong monumentality, and with a circular movement of gazes and gestures. The scene is set in a shadowy cave, with light filtering through openings in the rocks in subtle variations of chiaroscuro planes, amid reflections and colored shadows, capable of generating a sense of atmospheric binding that eliminates the effect of plastic isolation of the figures.

Having finally entered the Sforza circle, Leonardo was long engaged in the creation of an equestrian colossus, which never saw the light of day. In 1494 Ludovico il Moro assigned him the decoration of one of the minor walls of the refectory of Santa Maria delle Grazie, where Leonardo made The Last Supper, by 1498. As in the Adoration of the Magi painted in Florence, the artist investigated the deeper meaning of the Gospel episode, studying the reactions and "motions of the soul" to Christ's announcement of betrayal by one of the apostles. Emotions spread violently among the apostles, from one end of the scene to the other, overwhelming the traditional symmetrical alignments of the figures and grouping them three by three, with Christ isolated in the center (a loneliness both physical and psychological), due in part to the framing of the luminous openings in the background and the perspective box. Real space and painted space indeed appear illusionistically linked, due in part to the use of light analogous to the real light in the room, extraordinarily involving the viewer, in a procedure similar to what Bramante was experimenting with in architecture in those years.

A similar principle, of nullifying the walls, was also applied in the decoration of the Sala delle Asse in the Castello Sforzesco, covered with an interweaving of arboreal motifs.

Also commissioned by the Milanese court are a series of portraits, the most famous of which is the Lady with an Ermine (1488–1490). This is Moro's mistress Cecilia Gallerani, whose image, struck by a direct light, emerges from the dark background making a spiral motion with her bust and head that enhances the woman's grace and definitively breaks with the rigid setting of fifteenth-century "humanistic" portraits. Another of his mistresses was perhaps portrayed in La Belle Ferronnière, now in the Louvre.

For the wedding between Gian Galeazzo Maria Sforza and Isabella of Aragon, he staged the so-called Festa del Paradiso.

== First half of the 16th century ==
The death of Beatrice d'Este and the fall of Ludovico il Moro caused an abrupt interruption of all artistic commissions and a diaspora of artists. Nevertheless, the recovery was relatively quick, and the atmosphere in Milan and related territories remained lively. A key episode is the return of Leonardo da Vinci in 1507, until 1513.

Entirely alien to the Lombard tradition and style were the interventions, carried out by Galeazzo Sanseverino between 1515 and 1521, inside Mirabello Castle, seat of the Captain of the Visconti Park. The Sforza-era structure was reworked by inserting, a unicum in Lombardy, elements of French style, such as rectangular, stone-profiled windows and large late Gothic stone fireplaces. The interiors were also re-frescoed (most of the frescoes are still hidden under several layers of plaster). Until the Battle of Pavia in 1525, the political situation in the territory of the Duchy of Milan remained uncertain, with numerous armed clashes, after which Spanish dominance was established.

=== Leonardo's second stay ===
The French governor of Milan, Charles d'Amboise, urged as early as 1506 that Leonardo enter the service of Louis XII. The following year the king requested Leonardo, who agreed to return to Milan from July 1508. His second stay in Milan was an intense period: he painted The Virgin and Child with Saint Anne, completed, in collaboration with De Predis, the second version of the Virgin of the Rocks, and worked on geological, hydrographical and urban problems. Among other things, he studied a project for an equestrian statue in honor of Gian Giacomo Trivulzio as the architect of the French conquest of the city.

=== The Leonardeschi ===
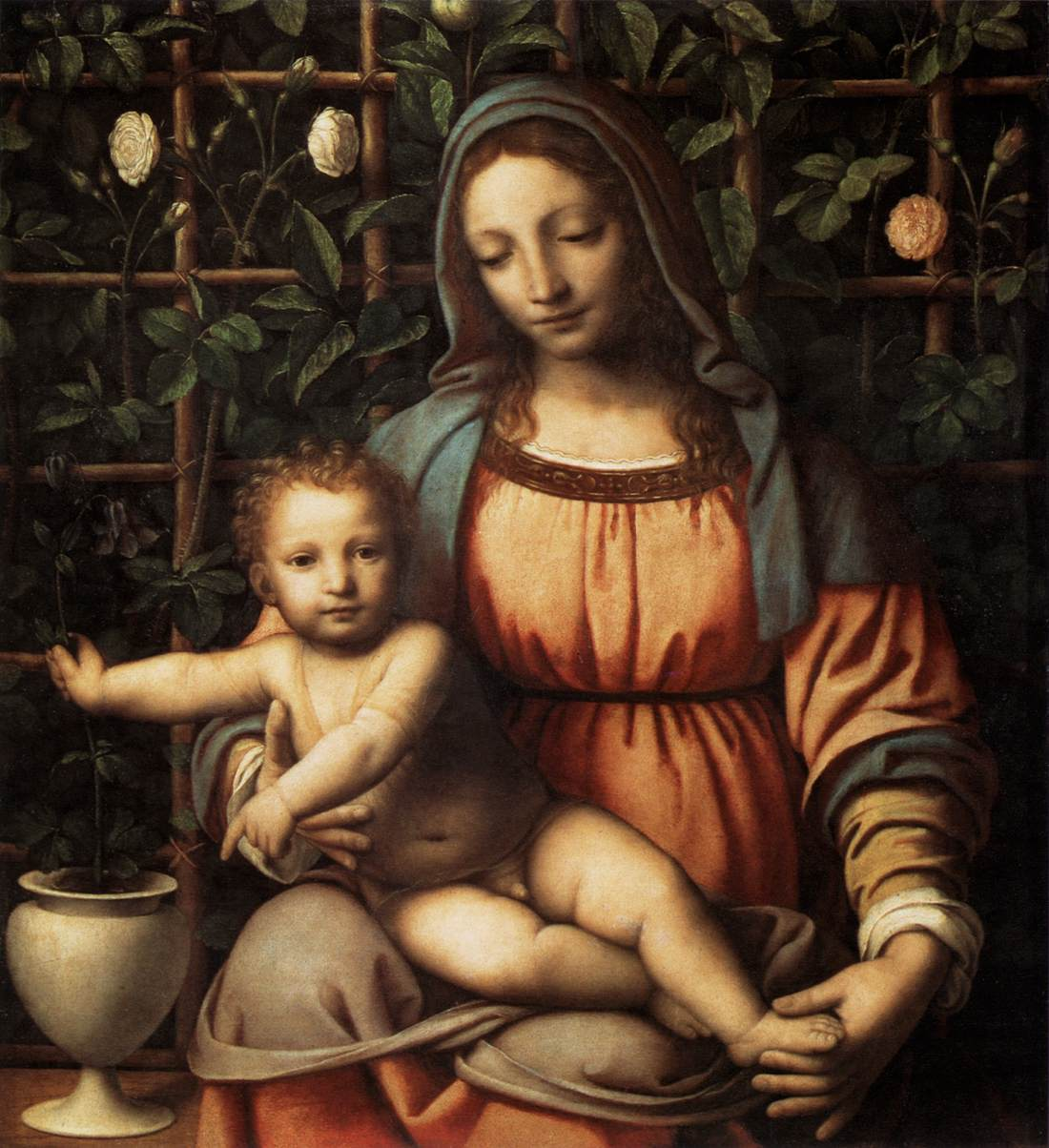
Bernardino Luini, Madonna of the Rose Garden, today in Brera

The illustrious examples produced by Leonardo were picked up and replicated by a conspicuous number of pupils (direct and indirect), the so-called "leonardeschi": Boltraffio, Andrea Solario, Cesare da Sesto, and Bernardino Luini among the main ones. Thus, at the beginning of the century, there was a uniformity of style in the Duchy linked to Leonardo's style.

The limitation of these artists, however gifted they were, was that they stuck to the style of the master, never coming to equal or propose an overcoming of his style. The most important merit of these painters was that, through their travels, they spread Leonardo's innovative style even to areas alien to his passage, such as Giovanni Agostino da Lodi in Venice or Cesare da Sesto in southern Italy and Rome.

The best known of the group was Bernardino Luini, who, however, adhered to Leonardo's influence in only a few works, particularly those on wood panels: exemplary in this respect is the Sacred Family in the Pinacoteca Ambrosiana, modeled on Leonardo's Virgin and Child with Saint Anne. In the third decade of the century, contact with Venetian works and personal maturation led him to achieve significant results in fresco cycles with a pleasing narrative vein, as in the church of San Maurizio al Monastero Maggiore in Milan, the sanctuary of the Madonna dei Miracoli in Saronno, and the church of Santa Maria degli Angeli in Lugano. Also interesting is the humanistic cycle formerly in Villa Rabia alla Pelucca near Monza (now in the Pinacoteca di Brera).

=== Bramantino ===
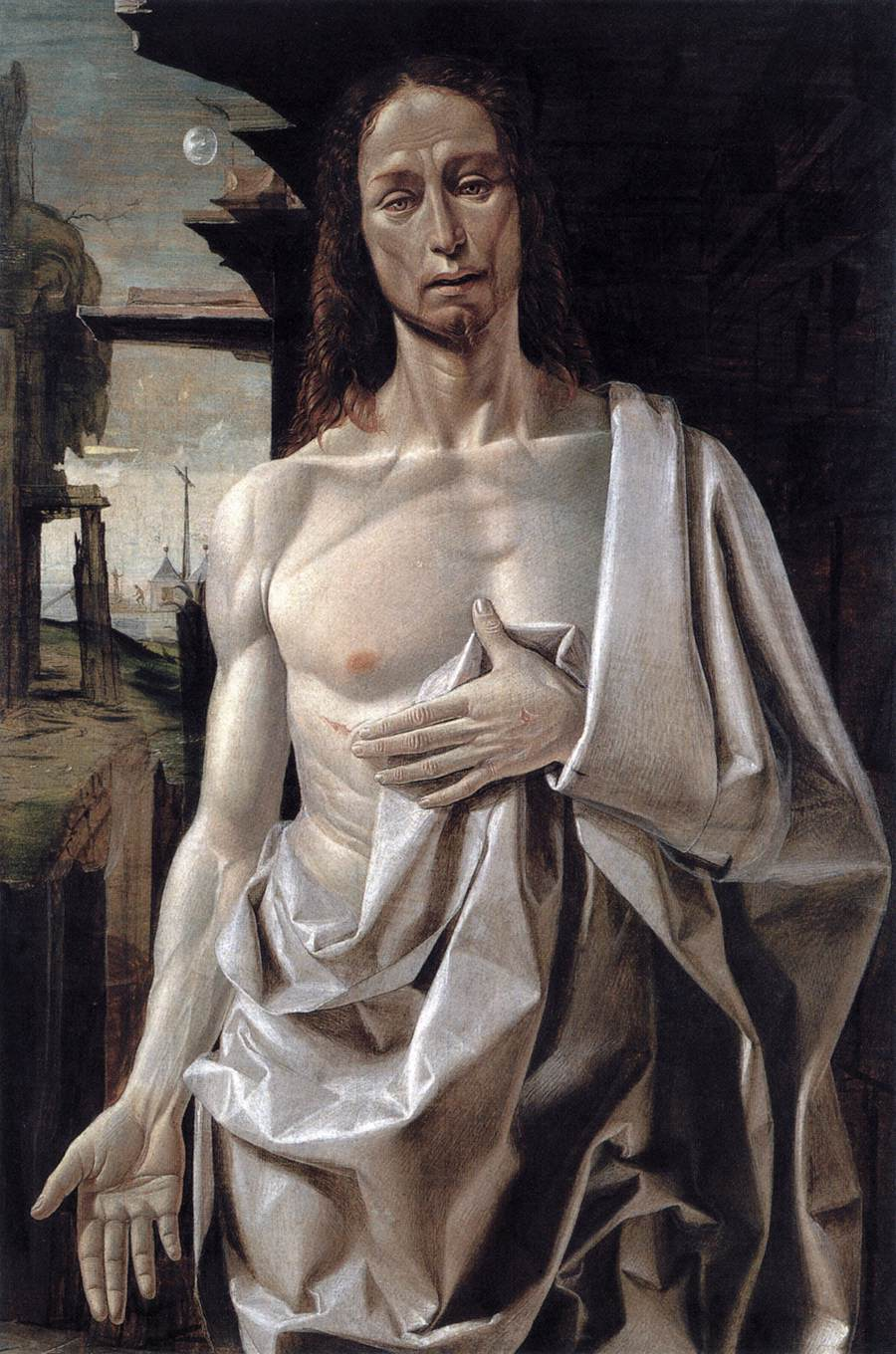
Bramantino, Christus Dolens

The only notable exception to the dominant Leonardesque style was the activity of Bartolomeo Suardi, known as the Bramantino because he was formed at the school of Bramante. His works are monumental and of great austerity, with a geometric simplification of forms, cold colors, graphic sign and pathetic intonation of sentiments.

In the early part of the century his works demonstrated a firm perspective approach, eventually turning to more explicitly devotional themes, such as the Christus Dolens in the Thyssen-Bornemisza Museum. Favored by Marshal Gian Giacomo Trivulzio, governor of Milan, he reached the height of fame in 1508, when he was called by Julius II to decorate the Raphael Rooms, although his works were soon destroyed to make room for Raphael.

In Rome he developed a taste for scenes framed by architecture, as seen in works after his return such as the Crucifixion in Brera or the Madonna of the Towers in the Pinacoteca Ambrosiana. He then gained great prestige from creating the cartoons for the cycle of the Trivulzio tapestries, commissioned by the Trivulzio and executed between 1504 and 1509 by the Vigevano manufactory, the first example of a cycle of tapestries produced in Italy without the use of Flemish craftsmen. In the early 1520s his style underwent further development from his contact with Gaudenzio Ferrari, which led him to accentuate realism, as seen in the landscape of the Flight into Egypt at the sanctuary of the Madonna del Sasso in Orselina, near Locarno (1520–1522).

=== Gaudenzio Ferrari ===
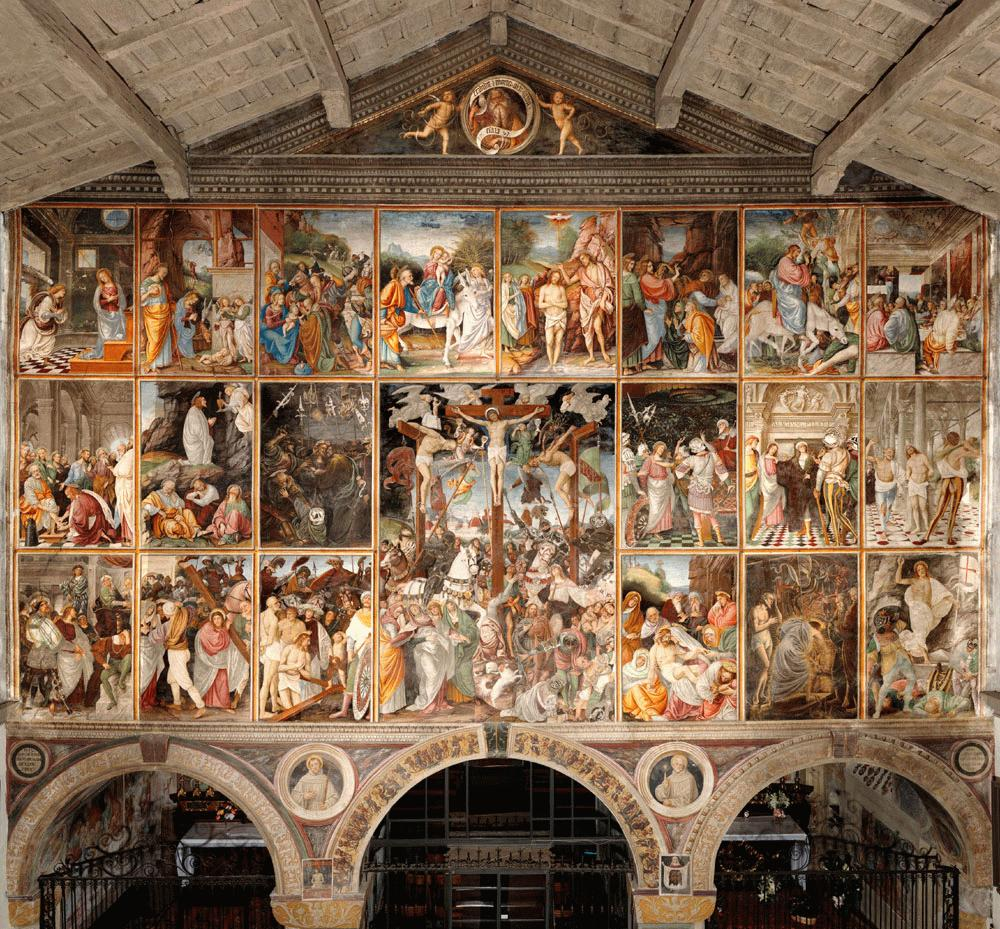
The "Gaudenzian wall" in the church of Santa Maria delle Grazie in Varallo

Gaudenzio Ferrari, a probable companion of Bramantino in Rome, was the other major player on the Lombard scene in the early 16th century. His training was based on the example of the Lombard masters of the late fifteenth century (Foppa, Zenale, Bramante, and especially Leonardo), but he also updated himself to the styles of Perugino, Raphael (from the period of the Stanza della Segnatura), and Dürer, whom he met through engravings.

All these stimuli are combined in grand works such as the frescoes of the Stories of Christ in the great cross-wall of the church of Santa Maria delle Grazie in Varallo (1513), the success of which later secured his engagement as painter and sculptor in the nascent Sacro Monte complex, where he worked industriously from about 1517 to 1528.

Later, during the 1530s, he worked in Vercelli (Stories of the Virgin and Stories of Magdalene in the church of San Cristoforo) and Saronno (Glory of Musician Angels in the dome of the sanctuary of the Blessed Virgin of Miracles. His career then ended in Milan.

=== Bergamo and Brescia ===
In the first decades of the sixteenth century, the border cities Bergamo and Brescia benefited from a remarkable artistic development, first under the impulse of foreign painters, especially from Venice, then of prominent local masters. The last outpost of the territories of the Serenissima and a territory subject in alternating phases to Milan and Venice, the two cities are united not only by their proximity but also by certain characteristics in the artistic field.

The Renaissance in these areas arrived in the middle of the second decade of the 16th century, initially with the sojourn of artists such as Vincenzo Foppa, who voluntarily moved away from the dominant Leonardism of Milan. A quantum leap occurred in Bergamo when Gaudenzio Ferrari and, especially, Lorenzo Lotto (from 1513) settled there. The latter, supported by a cultured and wealthy patronage, was able to develop his own dimension untethered from the language dominant in the more important centers of the peninsula, characterizing his works with a very bright palette, a sometimes unprejudiced compositional freedom and a tense psychological characterization of the characters. In addition to grandiose altarpieces such as the Martinengo Altarpiece or the San Bernardino Altarpiece and to cycles of frescoes rich in iconographic novelties, such as that of the Suardi Chapel in Trescore, it was above all the ambitious project of the inlays of the choir of Santa Maria Maggiore that kept him busy, until his departure in 1526.

In Brescia, the arrival of Titian's Averoldi Polyptych in 1522 gave rise to a group of local painters, almost of the same age, who, fusing their Lombard and Venetian cultural roots, developed results of great originality in the peninsula's artistic panorama: Romanino, Moretto and Savoldo.

== Second half of the 16th century ==
The second half of the century is dominated by the figure of Charles Borromeo and the Counter-Reformation. In 1564 the archbishop gave the "instructions" on architecture and art and found the best interpreter of his guidelines in Pellegrino Tibaldi.

A leading figure in late 16th-century Lombardy was Giovan Paolo Lomazzo, first a painter and then, following his blindness, an essayist. His work, extolling the local tradition, appears as a response to Vasari's "Tuscan-centrism," and elicited attention to unusual expressions of art and subjects.

== See also ==
- Renaissance art
- Leonardo da Vinci's Notebooks

== Bibliography ==
- De Vecchi, Pierluigi; Cerchiari, Elda (1999). I tempi dell'arte. Vol. 2. Bompiani. ISBN 88-451-7212-0.
- Zuffi, Stefano (2004). Il Quattrocento. Milan: Electa. ISBN 8837023154.
- Zuffi, Stefano (2005). Il Cinquecento. Milan: Electa. ISBN 8837034687.
