= Lamentation over the Dead Christ (Bramantino) =

Painting by Bramantino

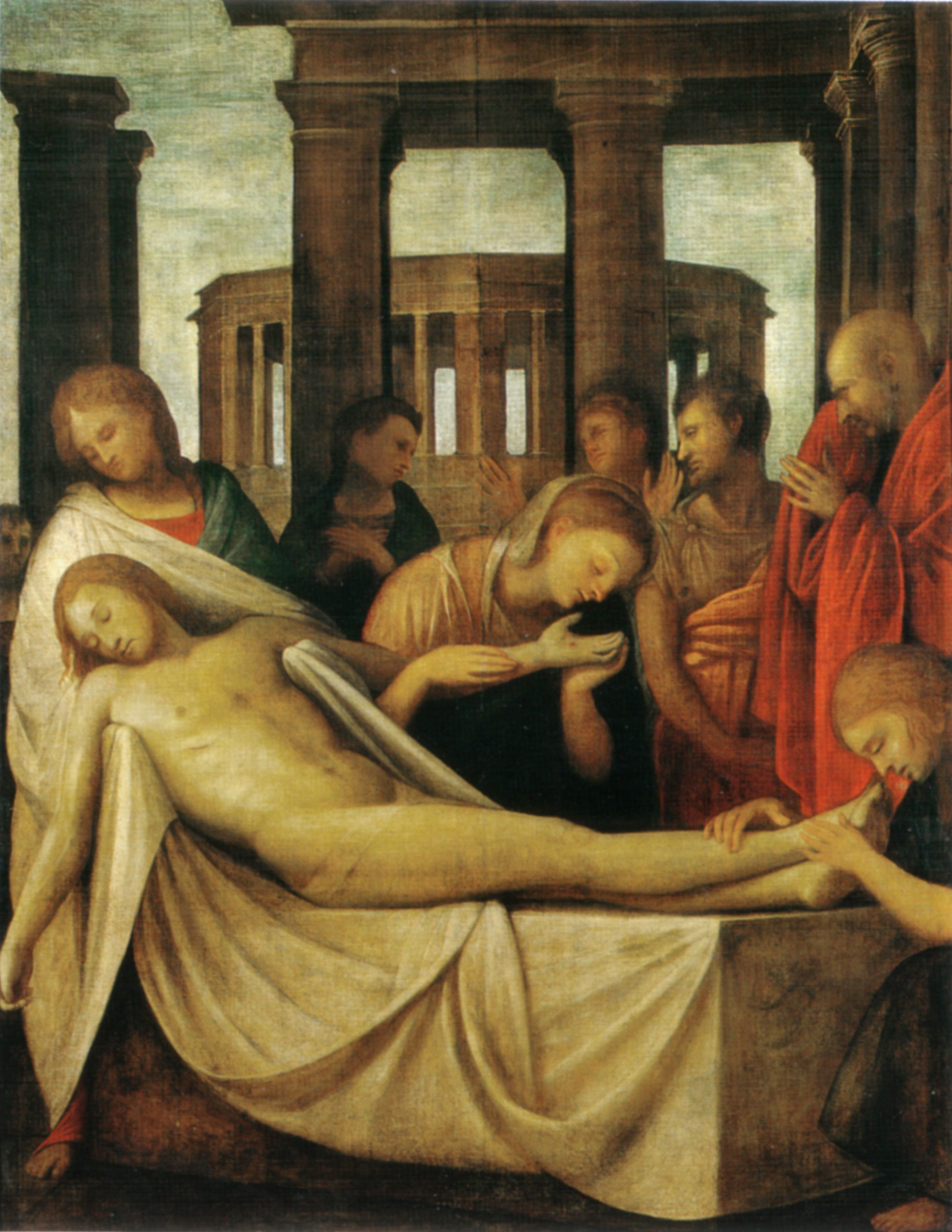
- Artist: Bramantino
- Year: 1515–1520
- Medium: Oil on canvas
- Movement: Italian Renaissance
- Location: Pinacoteca del Castello Sforzesco, Milan, Italy

Lamentation over the Dead Christ is an oil painting on canvas of c. 1515–1520 by the Italian Renaissance painter and architect Bramantino, painted for the church of San Barnaba in Milan. The work was acquired by the Werner family in 1985 and now in the Pinacoteca del Castello Sforzesco in the same city. A (possibly autograph) copy is now in a private collection.

The painting shows the influence of Roman artists such as Mantegna which Bramantino had picked up during his stay in Rome, especially in its use of perspective. As in his Palazzo della Ragione Madonna and the Madonna and Child with Eight Saints, he also uses several light sources, showing the influence of the recent Last Supper by Leonardo da Vinci.
