= Noli me tangere (Bramantino) =

Fresco by Bramantino

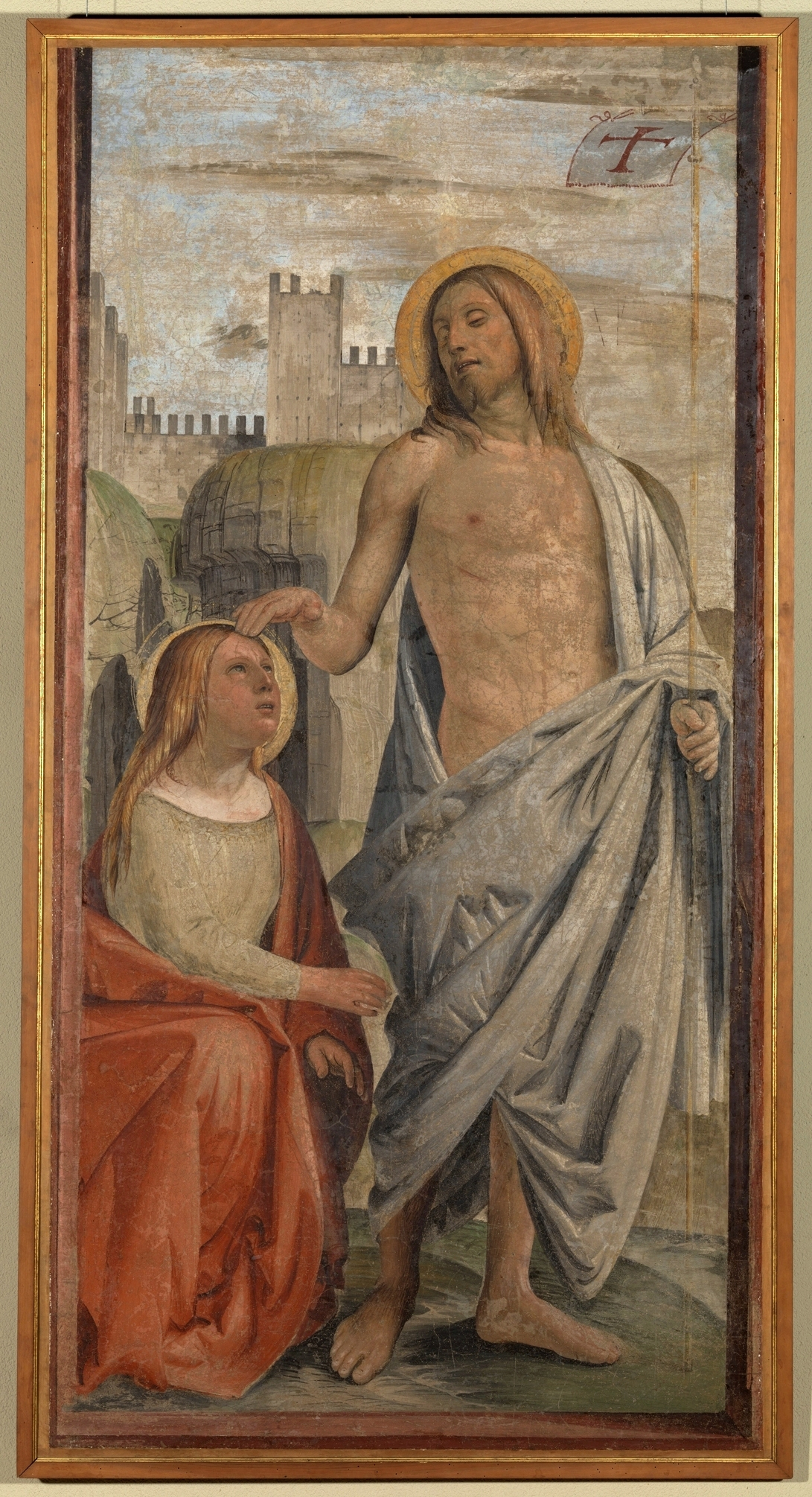
- Artist: Bramantino
- Year: c. 1498–1500
- Medium: Fresco
- Movement: Italian Renaissance
- Subject: Jesus and Mary Magdalene
- Location: Pinacoteca del Castello Sforzesco, Milan
- Coordinates: 45.464222°N 9.189556°E

Noli me tangere is a fragment of a fresco of c. 1498–1500 by the Italian Renaissance painter and architect Bramantino depicting Jesus and Mary Magdalene soon after the resurrection. It was originally in the church of Santa Maria del Giardino in Milan and since 1867 in the Pinacoteca del Castello Sforzesco in the same city, to which it was given by Prospero Moisè Loria.

One of the painter's earliest surviving works, it shows the strong influence of Bramante, particularly his 1497 fresco paintings of armed men for the Casa Visconti-Panigarola. Around the same time as Bramantino's fresco, Santa Maria del Giardino underwent a major redecoration, headed by Vincenzo Foppa. The swelling and wrinkled draperies, the simplification of the figures' volumes and the cold and metallic light support a dating in the 1490s, close to the same artist's Philemon and Baucis (Wallraf–Richartz Museum, Cologne), The Adoration of the Kings (National Gallery, London) and Pietà (Pinacoteca Ambrosiana).
