= Noli (disambiguation) =

Noli is a commune of Liguria, Italy.

Noli may also refer to:

== People ==
=== Given name ===
- Noli de Castro (born 1949), 14th Vice President of the Philippines and journalist
- Noli Eala, former commissioner of the Philippine Basketball Association
- Noli Francisco (1941–2017), American poker player
- Noli Locsin (born 1971), Filipino basketball player

=== Surname ===
- Andrea Noli (born 1972), Mexican actress
- António de Noli (born 1415 or 1419), Genoese nobleman and first Governor of Cape Verde
- Fan S. Noli (1882–1965), Albanian scholar, politician, and founder of the Albanian Orthodox Church

== Countries ==
- Republic of Noli, former Italian republic

== Other uses ==
- Noli railway station, in Pakistan

== See also ==
- Noli me tangere (disambiguation)
