= Bolognini Madonna =

Painting by Antonio da Correggio

- Madonna with child and John the Baptist
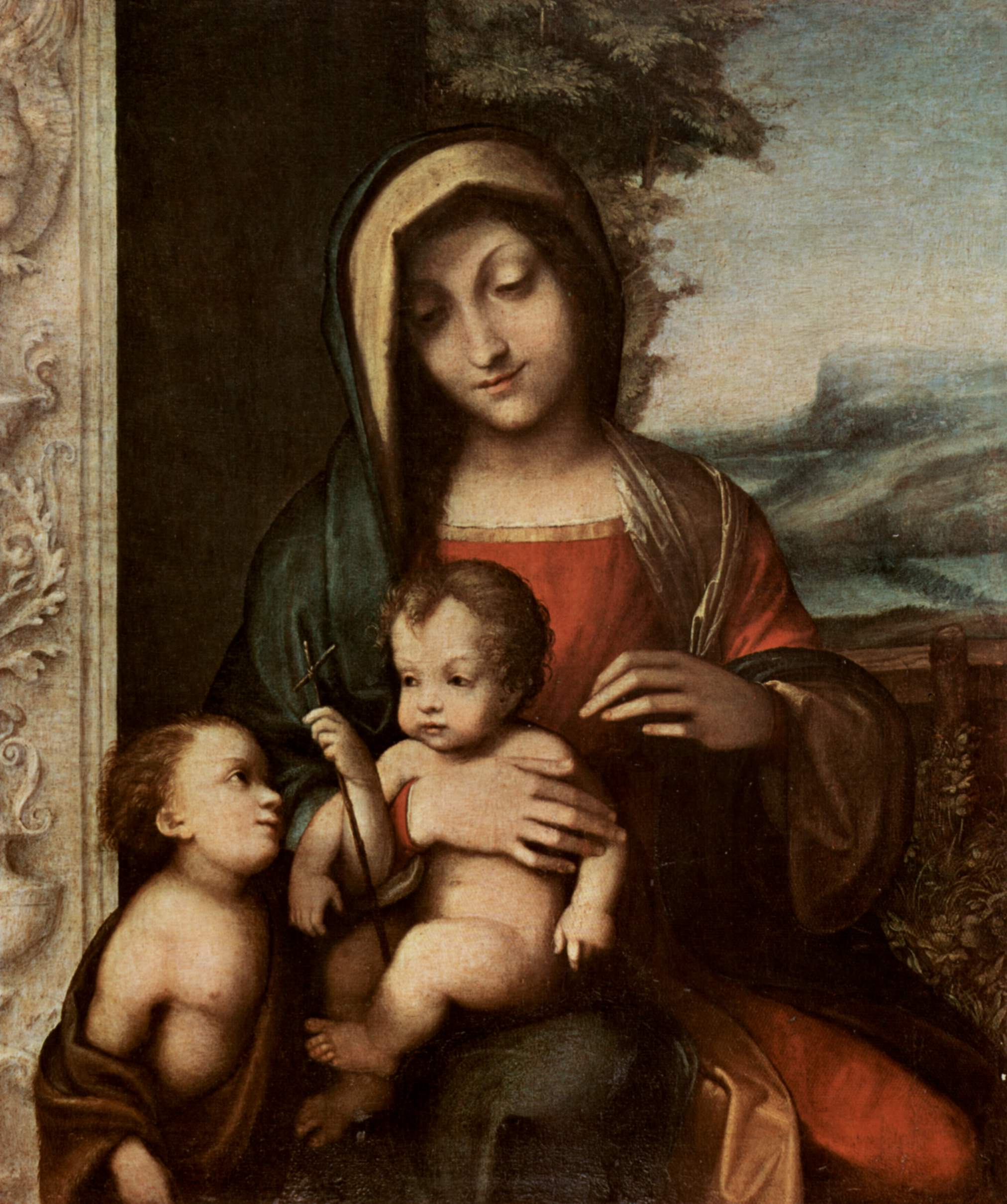
- Year: c. 1514–1519
- Dimensions: 60 cm (24 in) × 51 cm (20 in)
- Location: Sforza Castle Pinacoteca, , Milan

The Bolognini Madonna is an oil-on-panel painting (later transferred to canvas) executed ca. 1514–1519 by the Italian Renaissance painter Antonio da Correggio.

== History ==
It is dated to around 1514–1519, sometime between his Madonna and Child with St Francis (1514–1515) and his lost Albinea Madonna (1517–1519). It has been attributed to Correggio since the late 19th century.

In 1865, the painting was left by Gian Giacomo Attendolo Bolognini (for whom the painting is now named) to the Pinacoteca del Castello Sforzesco in Milan, where it now hangs. It is compositionally related to the artist's Madonna and Child with the Infant John the Baptist.

== Description and style ==
In the painting, a room with a pilaster decorated by candelabras in low relief opens onto a distant river landscape, far behind the portrait subject. Seated and at half figure, the Madonna holds the Baby Jesus in her lap as he plays with a young Saint John the Baptist who is handing him a cross—symbol of the future sacrifice of Jesus. The painting represents one of many variants on the theme of the meeting of Saint John and the Baby Jesus, a theme dear to Leonardo da Vinci and to his Milanese Leonardeschi circle. The painting, in fact, is an example of the Leonardic influence on the young Correggio, both in the physical depiction of the Madonna, and in the landscape and the use of sfumato. The sfumato smudging is accentuated by the effects of shadows as in the veil of Marie that, hanging from the side of her head, casts a melancholy shadow over her face.

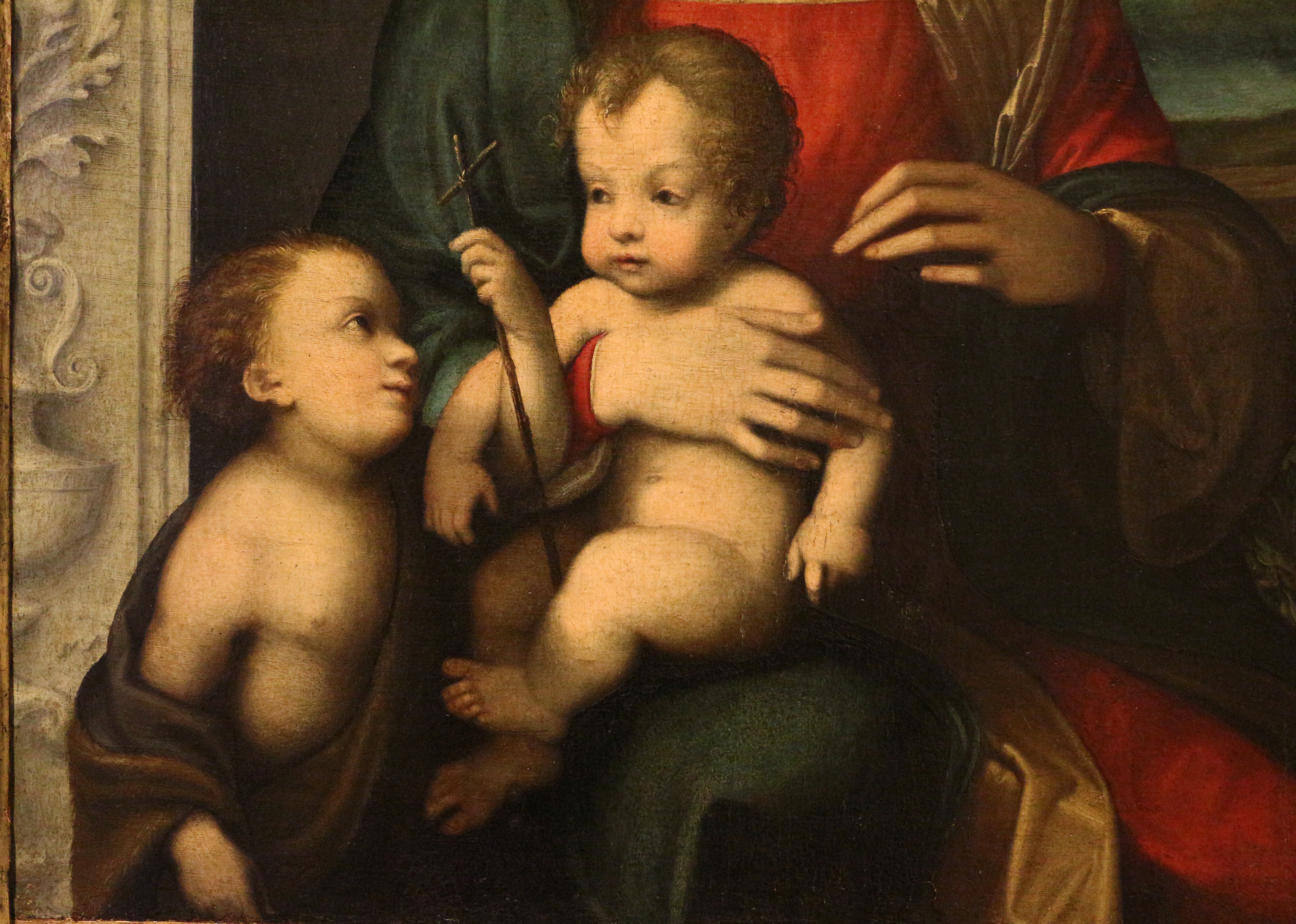
Detail of Madonna Bolognini

The painting's atmosphere is pervaded by a subtle disquiet that characterizes many paintings of this subject. Here, that emotion is damped in favor of an affable and sweet scene, where the two children meet, despite some ominous hints. Only the left hand of Marie, that seems suspended between the desire to protect Jesus and the choice to leave him to his destiny, insinuates her foresight.

The net of light that illuminates the low-relief contrast with the humid and vaporous landscape demonstrates the inspirations of the young Correggio. The chromatic texture, that balances reds, yellows, and blue, joins the figures and the landscape yet emphasizes its protagonists. For example, the mass of foliage of the tree illuminated behind Marie makes her figure stand out and extends her perceived stature.

Given that the work was transferred from a panel to canvas, the colors were certainly once more vivid, as in the impression that the painting is a little out of focus. It is more likely due to the result of that intervention than a stylistic choice.

Compared to the analogous Madonna and Child with Saints Elizabeth and John the Baptist in the Philadelphia Museum of Art that preceded it, the Bolognini Madonna appears better articulated and more atmospheric, with the Leonardic landscape in the background and the finely decorated pilaster in the foreground. This combination might be a concession by Correggio to the archaeological fantasies of Mantegna and an homage, perhaps, to his decoration of the Palazzo dei Principi doors.

== Bibliography ==
- Adani, Giuseppe (2007). Correggio : pittore universale (1489-1534) : monografia esplicativa e didattica (in Italian). Cinisello Balsamo, Milano: Silvana. ISBN 9788836609772.
- La Pinacoteca del Castello sforzesco a Milano (in Italian). Milano: Skira. 2005. ISBN 88-7624-260-0.
