= Madonna of the Towers =

Painting by Bramantino

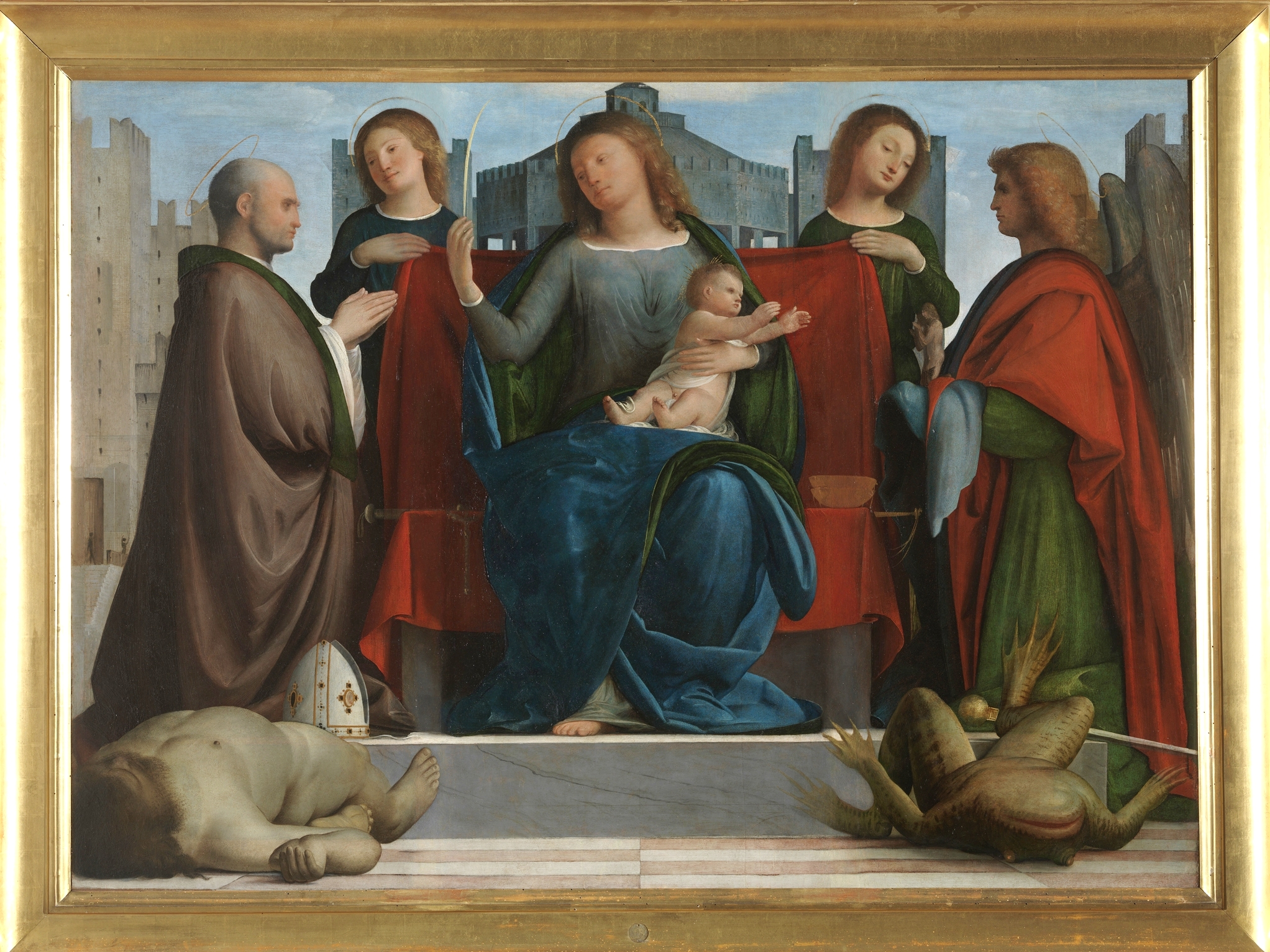
Madonna of the Towers (c. 1505–1519) by Bramantino

Madonna of the Towers (Italian: Madonna delle Torri) is a painting in tempera on panel of c. 1505–1519 by the Italian Renaissance painter and architect Bramantino, produced after his return from Rome. Previously in the church of San Michele alla Chiusa in Milan, in 1872 it was donated by Lodovico Melzi d'Eril to the Pinacoteca Ambrosiana in the same city, where it still hangs.

To the left is Saint Ambrose of Milan and to the right the Archangel Michael, with Arius and the Devil at their feet respectively. Some 17th-century additions in the sky and the towers behind the angels are still to be seen, though a tripartite frame was removed in 1956.
