= Kleinberger Madonna =

Painting by Bramantino

Madonna and Child
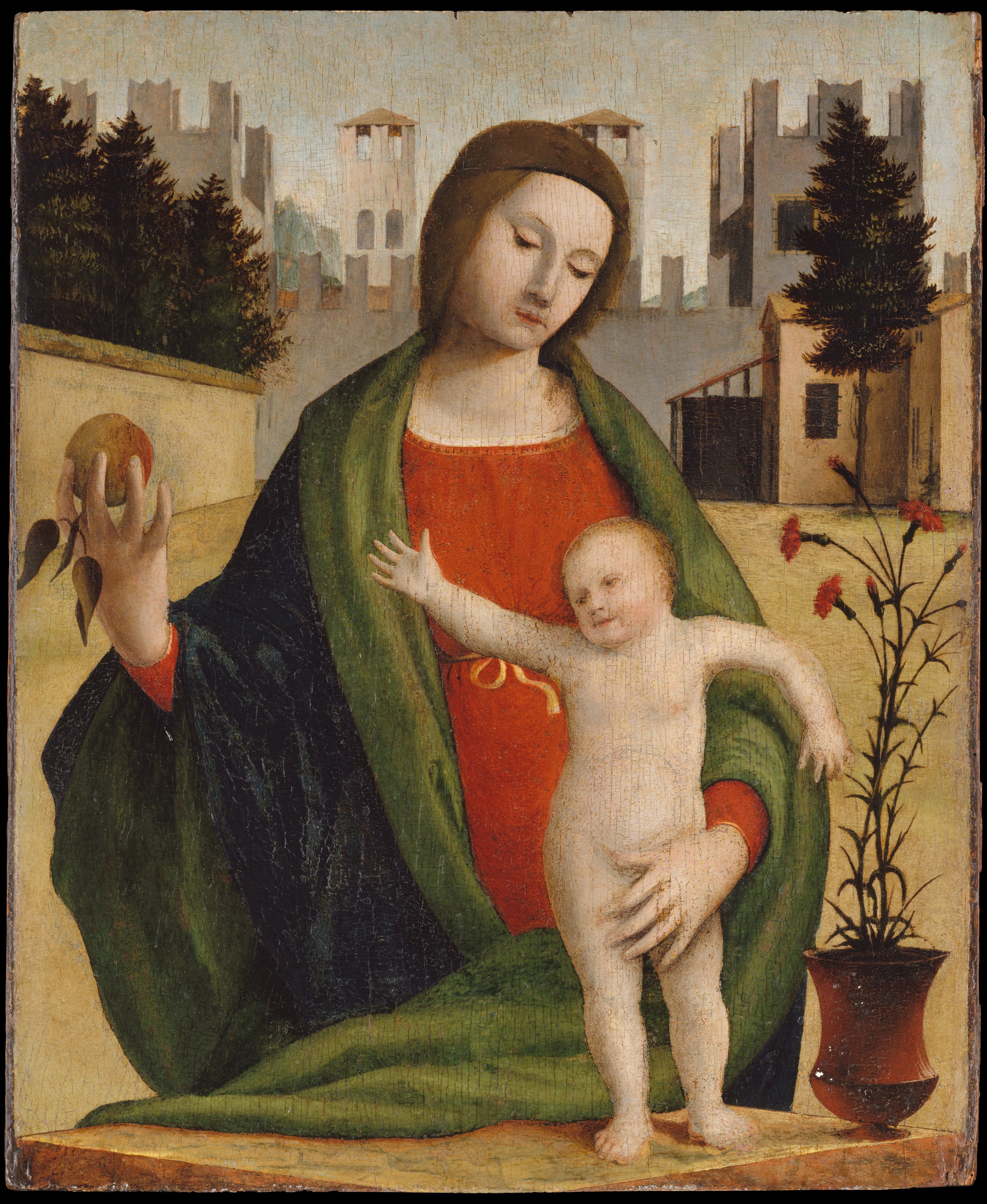
- Artist: Bramantino
- Year: Before 1508
- Medium: Tempera on panel
- Dimensions: 34.3 cm (13.5 in) × 27.6 cm (10.9 in)
- Location: Metropolitan Museum of Art
- Accession: 12.178.2

The Kleinberger Madonna is a painting in tempera on panel by the Italian Renaissance painter Bramantino, dating to before 1508, in the Metropolitan Museum of Art, New York.

The work's history is unknown before the early 20th century, when it was recorded in Count Victor Goloubew's collection in Paris and misattributed to Francesco Francia. In 1912 Goloubew sold it to the art dealer Kleinberger, who later that year sold it to its present owner.

The work is in a poor state of conservation and partially repainted on the Madonna's face. Rendered with Bramantino's typical simplification of volumes and shapes, the scene is set in a courtyard with a backdrop of a crenellated wall with towers. On a yellow granite cube stands the naked child, who leans towards an apple held by his mother, accepting his destiny as the redeemer of humanity (the apple represents the fruit of the original sin that will be washed with the martyrdom of Christ).

The vase with red carnations is also a symbol: the color recalls the blood of the Passion of Christ, and also symbolizes the mystical marriage between mother and son – that is, Christ and his Church.
