= Adoration of the Kings (Bramantino) =

Painting by Bramantino

The Adoration of the Kings
- The Adoration of the Magi
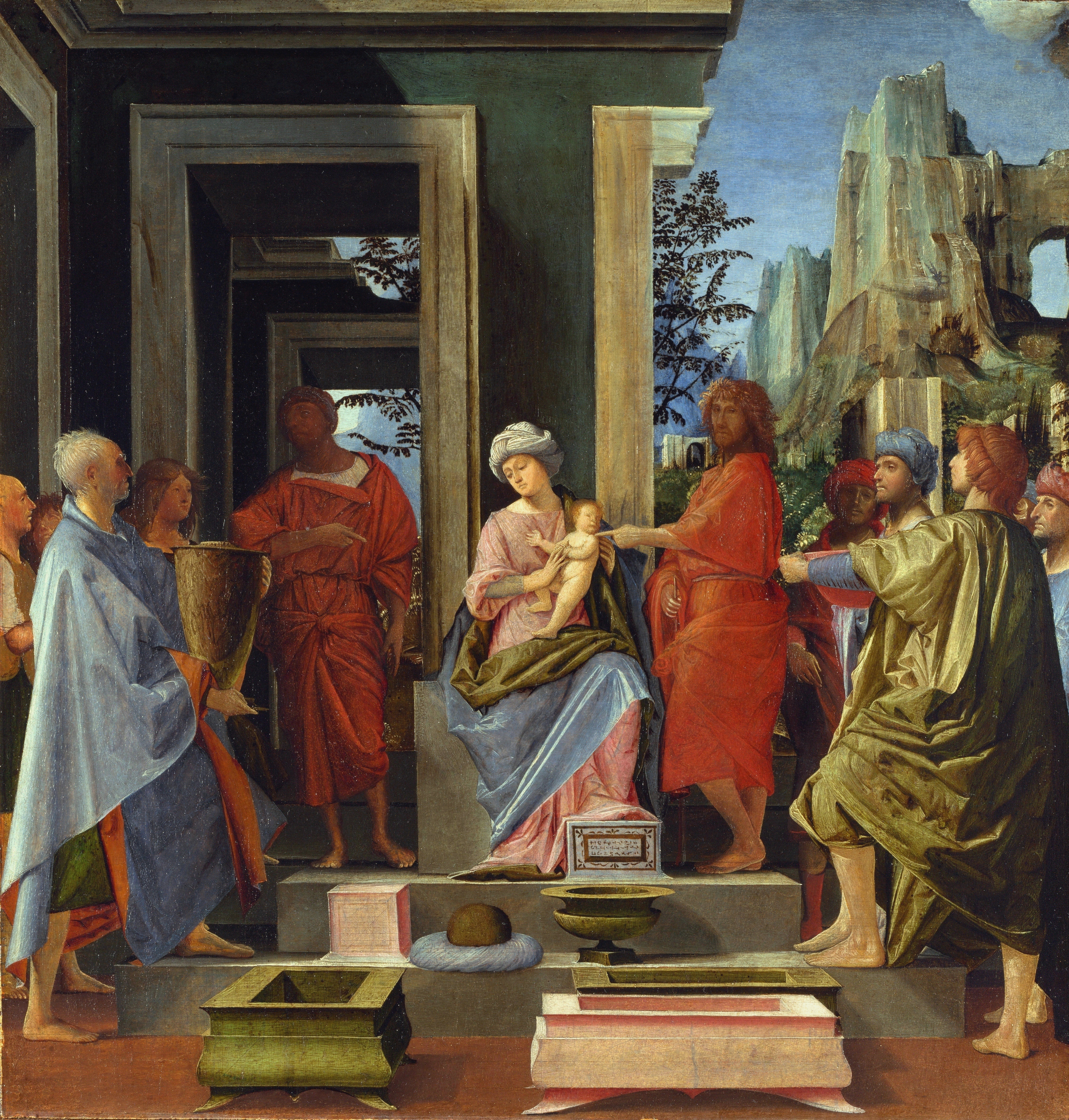
- Artist: Bramantino
- Year: c. 1500
- Medium: Oil on panel
- Subject: Adoration of the Magi
- Dimensions: 56.8 cm (22.4 in) × 55 cm (22 in)
- Location: National Gallery
- Identifiers: Art UK artwork ID: the-adoration-of-the-kings-115392

The Adoration of the Kings is a small oil painting on panel of c. 1500 by the Italian Renaissance painter and architect Bramantino in the National Gallery, London. In it the Holy Family and the Magi are, unusually, joined by an adult John the Baptist, whose Baptism of Christ was celebrated on the same day as Epiphany in the liturgical calendar. At 56.8 cm (22.4 in) × 55 cm (22 in), it was probably commissioned for private use by an individual rather than for placing in a church, but nothing is known about its early history. The panel entered the National Gallery in 1916 as part of the Layard Bequest.

Bramantino was a painter in Milan, who is relatively little known outside northern Italy, where most of his paintings remain; this is the only known example in the United Kingdom. In a Milanese art scene dominated by Leonardo da Vinci, Bramantino instead belonged to a tradition of "the structured but immobile realism of the Quattrocento ... that was fundamentally distinct from Leonardo's thought", descending from Piero della Francesca, via Bramantino's master Bramante.

== Description ==
The painting is "highly unusual and inventive both in its design and its iconography", as are other paintings by Bramantino. In contrast to most 15th-century paintings of the subject, the Three Kings are dressed very plainly, if in loose classical robes, and are barefoot, like nearly all the male figures. There is even some uncertainty as to which figures represent them, though it is usually thought they are the older man with a blue robe at left, the red-headed man with a green robe at right, and (less certainly) the pointing man in red at the viewer's left of the Virgin, who has perhaps deposited as his gift the pink box or the urn below her feet on the first step. However, it has been suggested that this last man is the prophet Isaiah, pointing to the fulfilment of his prophecy, in which case the man in the blue turban on the right side might be the third king.

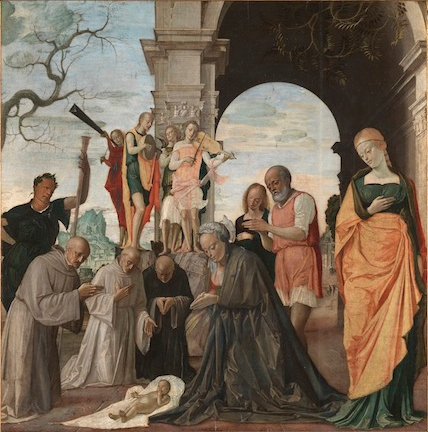
Adoration of the Christ Child (c. 1485) by Bramantino, Milan

On this account, Saint Joseph appears to be absent – which is unusual but not unprecedented – or relegated to the background. Some writers have suggested that the pointing figure carrying a rod to the viewer's right of the Virgin is him, but his age and appearance are unlike the conventional Josephs of the period, and much closer to that of John the Baptist. The prophet Daniel has also been proposed as the identity of this figure. Either John or Daniel could be regarded as prophets of the appearance of Christ as the Messiah.

If the man wearing red with a rod is John the Baptist, then his depicted age is anachronistic, as John was regarded as only a few years older than Jesus, but much less so than for Isaiah. An earlier Adoration of the Christ Child by Bramantino (c. 1485), now in the Pinacoteca Ambrosiana in Milan, contains an even more eclectic group of figures: several wingless angels playing instruments, three medieval saints, the Tiburtine Sibyl at far right, and at the far left a figure variously identified as the pagan god Apollo (favoured by the museum), the Emperor Augustus or the poet Virgil. The sibyl, Augustus and Virgil can all be related to medieval legends concerning prophecies of the coming of Christ; an ageing Apollo, if he is the figure, appears resigned to the new dispensation. One legend appears in the Golden Legend (1.40); a sibyl prophesies to Augustus that his Temple of Peace in Rome would crumble the day a virgin gave birth.

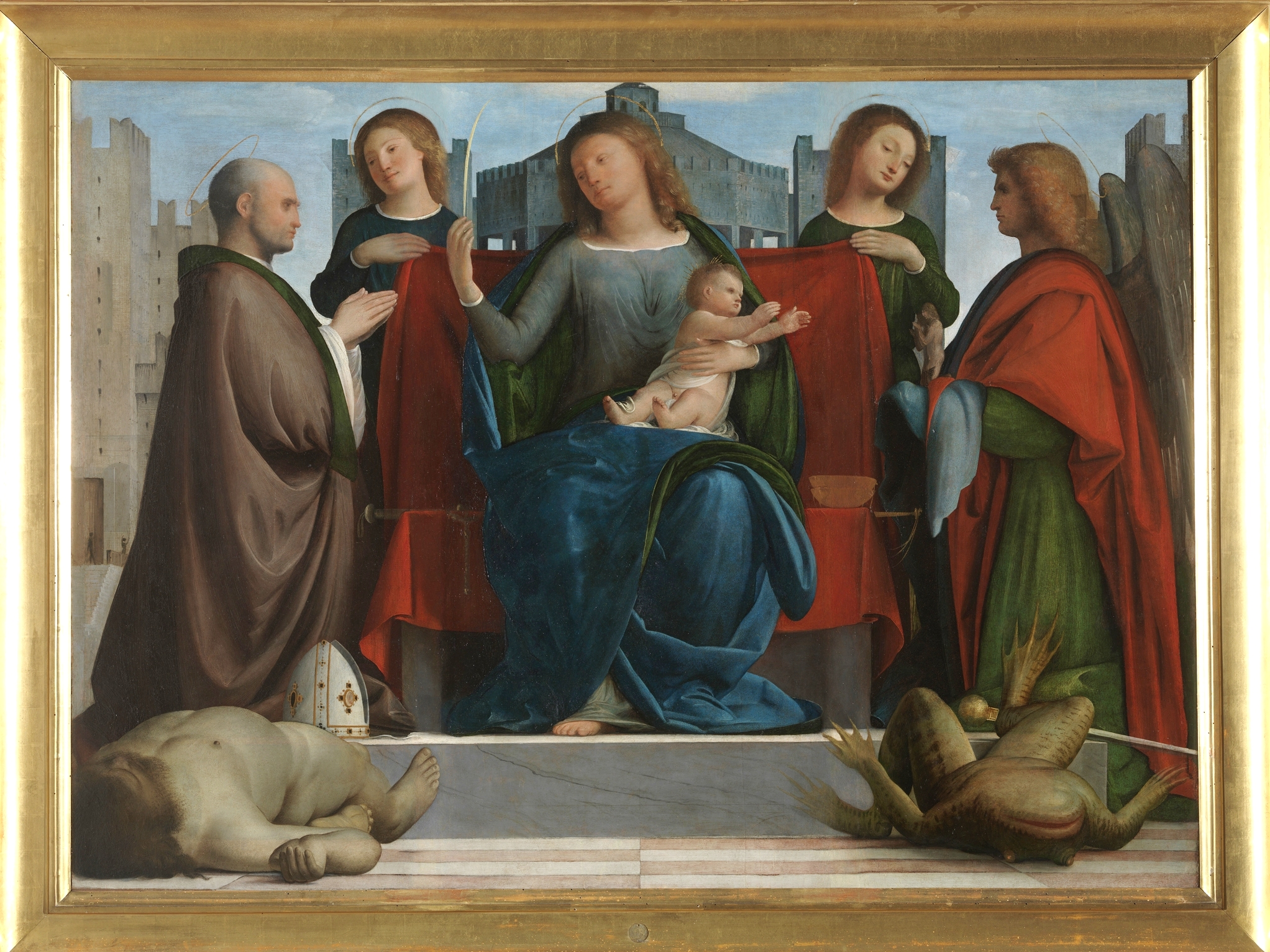
Madonna of the Towers, c. 1520, Pinacoteca Ambrosiana

The landscape background at right was changed at least once by the artist; originally there was a towering city or castle "with tall, square towers", a motif used in other paintings of his, where "looming silhouettes of an imagined and unpeopled architecture, constructed with a rule and square, take increasing prominence in his designs". He perhaps realized that this would seem out of scale here. These were a pinkish colour, and their main forms were roughly retained when they were converted to high outcrops of rock.

== Perspective scheme ==
Cleaning and restoration, plus technical examination, in the early 1990s revealed the full extent of the elaborate straight lines made under the paint as a framework for the perspective scheme. These are in ink and scratched into the gesso base layer; some can just be seen by the naked eye, while others are clear in the unpainted edges of the poplar panel, when the frame is removed. More were revealed by x-ray photography and infrared spectroscopy. They reveal Bramantino's "obsessional interest in the complexities of perspective". He is known to have written a treatise on the subject, now known only from parts included in a later work by Gian Paolo Lomazzo.

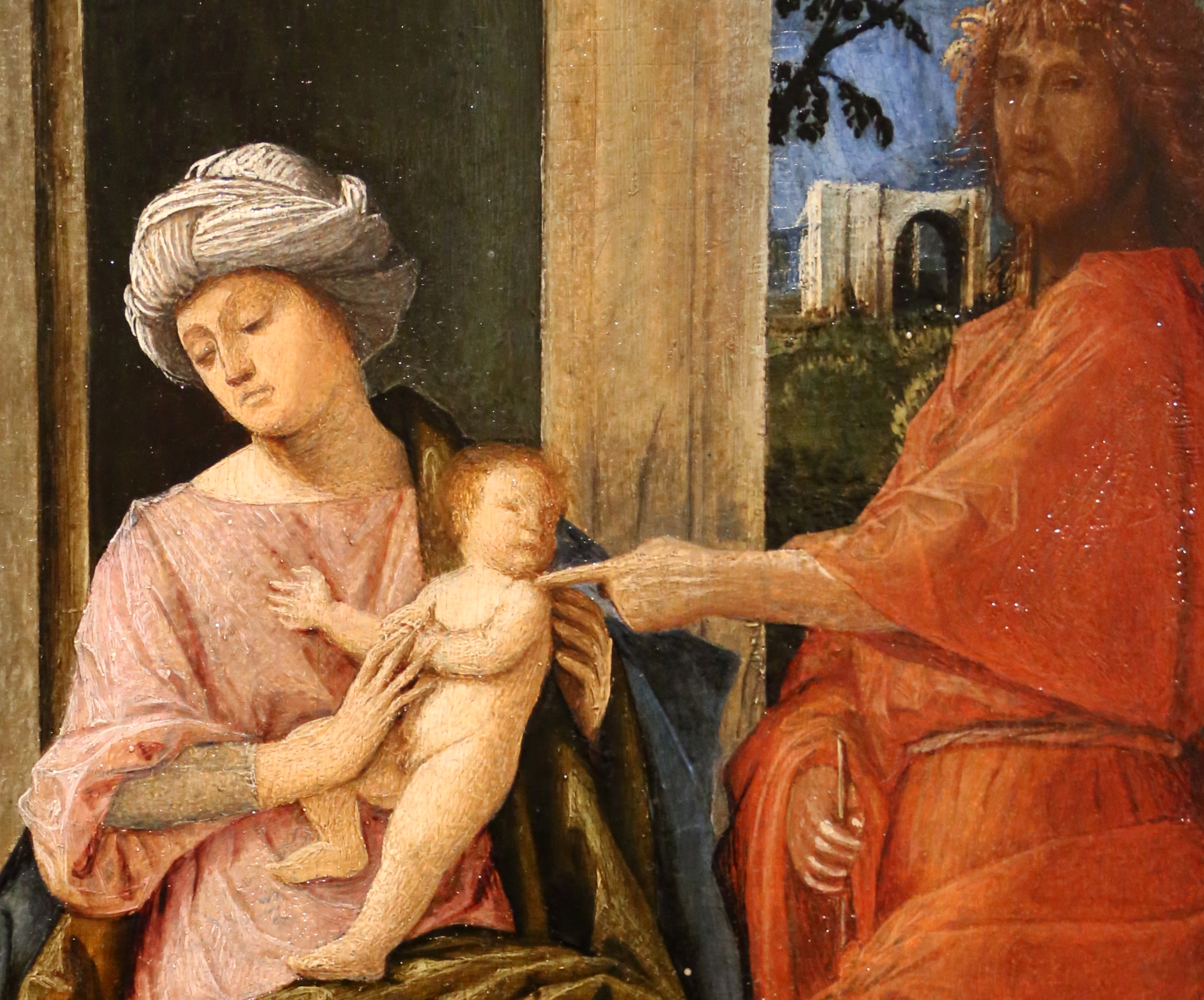
Detail of the Virgin and Child and John the Baptist

The scheme includes a scheme with a single vanishing point located low down in the Virgin's robes at the horizontal centre of the painting, marked by several incised lines. The two receding side edges of the top of the pink box on the first step are on two of the lines leading to it, and a vertical line passing through it touches the extreme left of the urn on the first step, and runs along the top left edge of the pink container on the ground. Above it passes through the Christ Child's hand. There are also sets of straight lines, at diminishing intervals, the vertical ones at the left of the painting, and the horizontal ones at the top. The most central point where the two sets intersect is around Isaiah's chin.

These "receding grids" are, Jill Dunkerton suggests, "redundant", and perhaps made because Bramantino got "carried away by his enthusiasm for the theory of perspective." The three open containers in front of the dais have no obvious function, unless as unusual containers for the kings' gifts, and are probably there as a demonstration of the painter's skill in perspective, matched by the round shapes of the hat and vase on the step above them. Perhaps realizing that he needed to "mitigate the somewhat over-insistent effect of recession, which can result from an over-punctilious application of single-point perspective", Bramantino introduced a number of spatial ambiguities and uncertainties in the design of the dais, and the figures on and around it, to produce a "spatial composition with a considerable subtlety". Dunkerton suggests he may have used a three-dimensional model for this, and produces computer-generated simulations herself.

The scheme shows that the ideal viewing point, or "optimal viewing distance", is at 1.02 metres in front of the painting at the level of the vanishing point. This reinforces the idea that the painting was intended for a private setting.

== Provenance ==
The history of the painting is unknown until 1862, when it was bought from the Manfrin Collection in Venice by Sir Austen Layard, the excavator of Nineveh and other sites in the Near East in the 1840s and early 1850s. Layard had become wealthy from his best-selling accounts of his excavations, and embarked on a political career that included a number of ministerial positions, spending much of his time in Venice, where he built up a notable collection of paintings. In 1862 he was Parliamentary Under-Secretary of State for Foreign Affairs in the Liberal government led by Lord Palmerston.

Layard had bought the painting with an attribution to Mantegna. He sent the painting, which was in poor condition, to Giuseppe Molteni, a restorer he used in Milan. At the restorer's workshop it was seen by the National Gallery's "travelling agent", Otto Mündler, and then by Sir Charles Eastlake, then Director. Mündler identified it as a Bramantino. Eastlake described it in a letter back to the gallery as "a little picture in a not very promising state which looked like a Bramantino ... now here in the hands of Molteni, who has already removed the repaintings". He was especially interested because back in London another Adoration (NG 729) was being restored, which at the time was thought to be by Bramantino, but which is now attributed to Vincenzo Foppa. Foppa was a generation older than Bramantino, and this is a far more conventional rendering of the subject.

Layard died in 1894, leaving his paintings to the National Gallery with a life interest to his wife, who died in 1912, but due to complications, including exporting them from Italy, many were not received into the gallery until 1916.
