= Pinacoteca del Castello Sforzesco =

Museum in Italy

Coordinates: 45°28′11″N 9°10′49″E

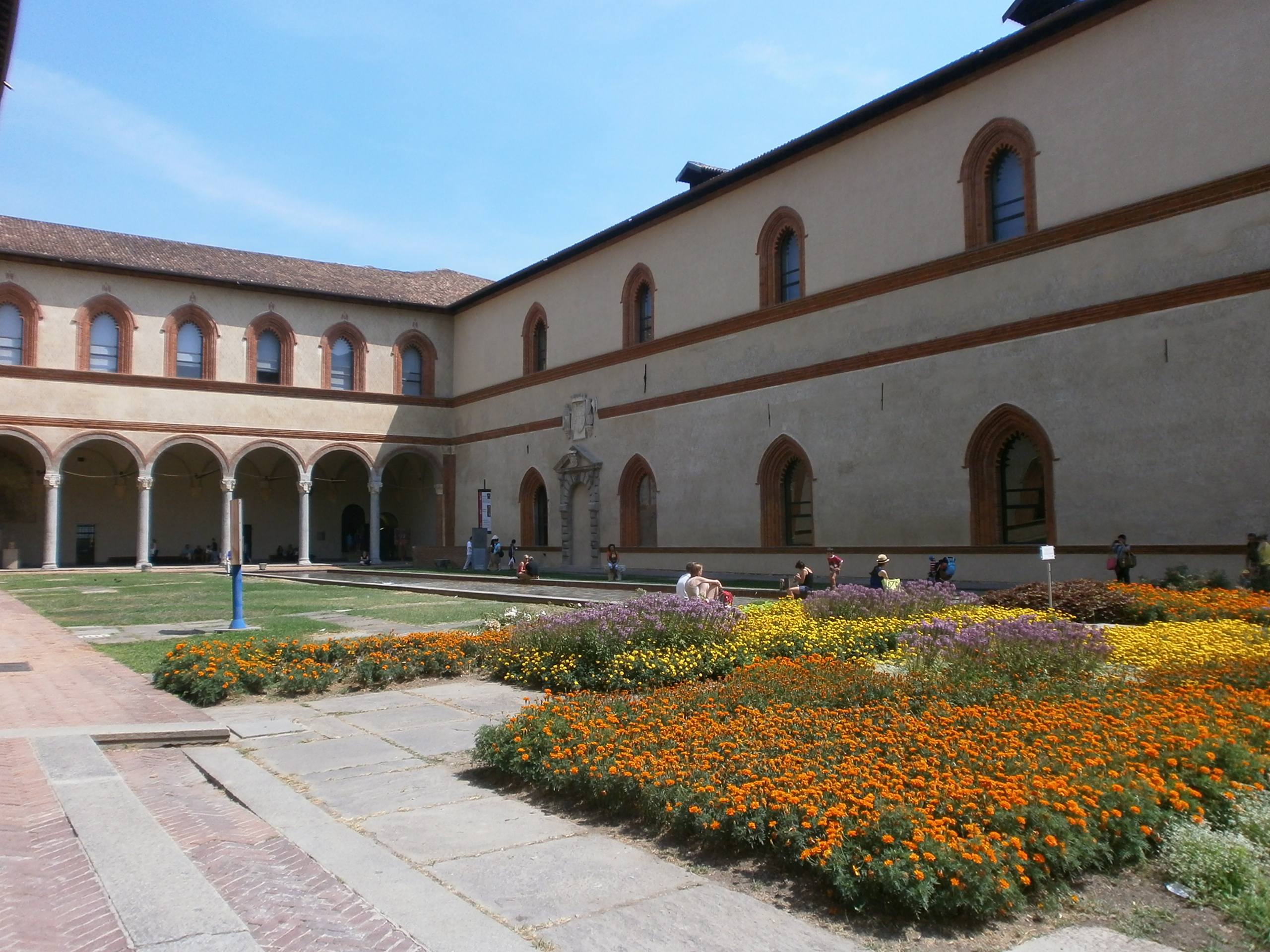
- Inner view of the Sforza Castle
- Location: Piazza Castello 3, 20121, Milan, Italy
- Director: Claudio Salsi
- Website: pinacoteca.milanocastello.it/en

The Pinacoteca del Castello Sforzesco ("Sforza Caste Art Gallery") is an art gallery in the museum complex of the Sforza Castle in Milan, Italy.

== History ==
Inaugurated in 1878, the gallery displays over 230 artworks, which include masterpieces by Titian, Andrea Mantegna, Canaletto, Antonello da Messina, Pisanello, Vincenzo Foppa, Giovanni Bellini, Correggio, Bernardino Luini, Lorenzo Lotto, Tintoretto and others. The complete collection of the museum, enriched in the last two centuries by donations of illustrious citizens and collectors, now has more than 1,500 artworks.

The first rooms of the Pinacoteca are dedicated to religious paintings of the 15th and 16th centuries, with artworks by Vincenzo Foppa, Bergognone, Bramantino, Carlo Crivelli, Bernardino Luini and other Lombard and Italian Renaissance painters. This part of the museum includes the Trivulzio Madonna by Andrea Mantegna, dating from 1497. (Another Trivulzio Madonna by Filippo Lippi is also in the museum.)

The second half of the Pinacoteca displays artworks from the 16th, 17th and 18th centuries. This includes both secular and religious works from artists such as Canaletto, Giambattista Tiepolo, Bernardo Bellotto, Titian and Tintoretto.

Some portraits of members of the Sforza family from the 15th to 16th centuries are also on display in the museum.

== See also ==
- Sforza Castle

== Gallery ==
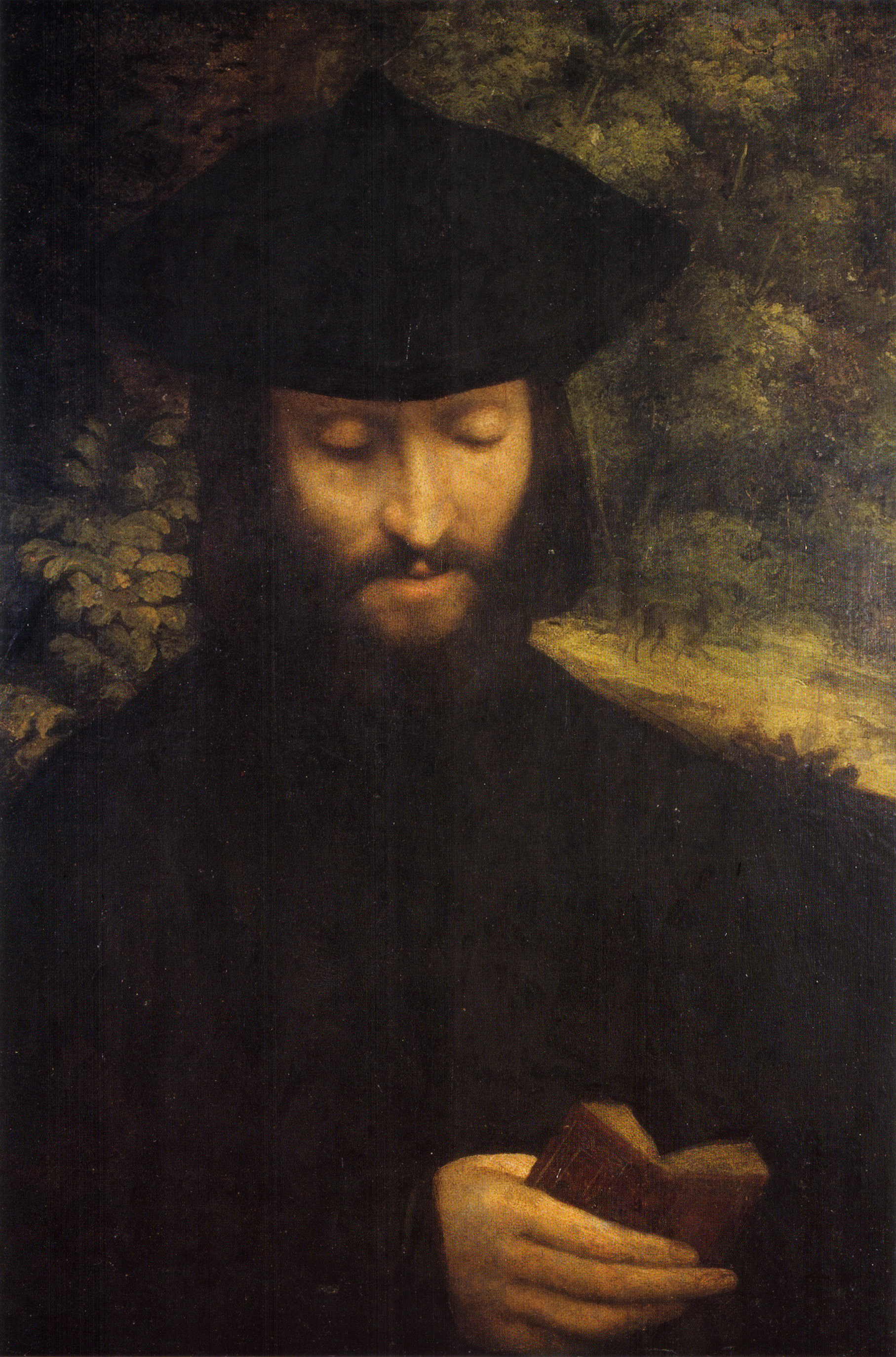
Portrait of a Man with a Book
Correggio, 60 × 42.5 cm, 1522.

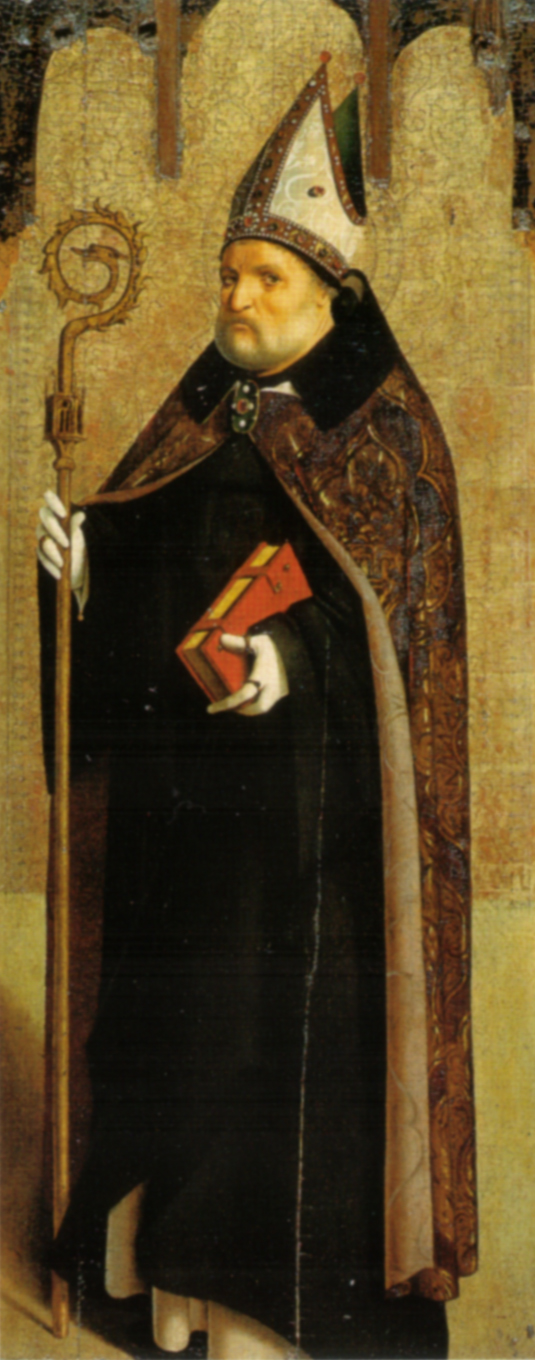
Saint Benedict
Antonello da Messina, 1470–1475.

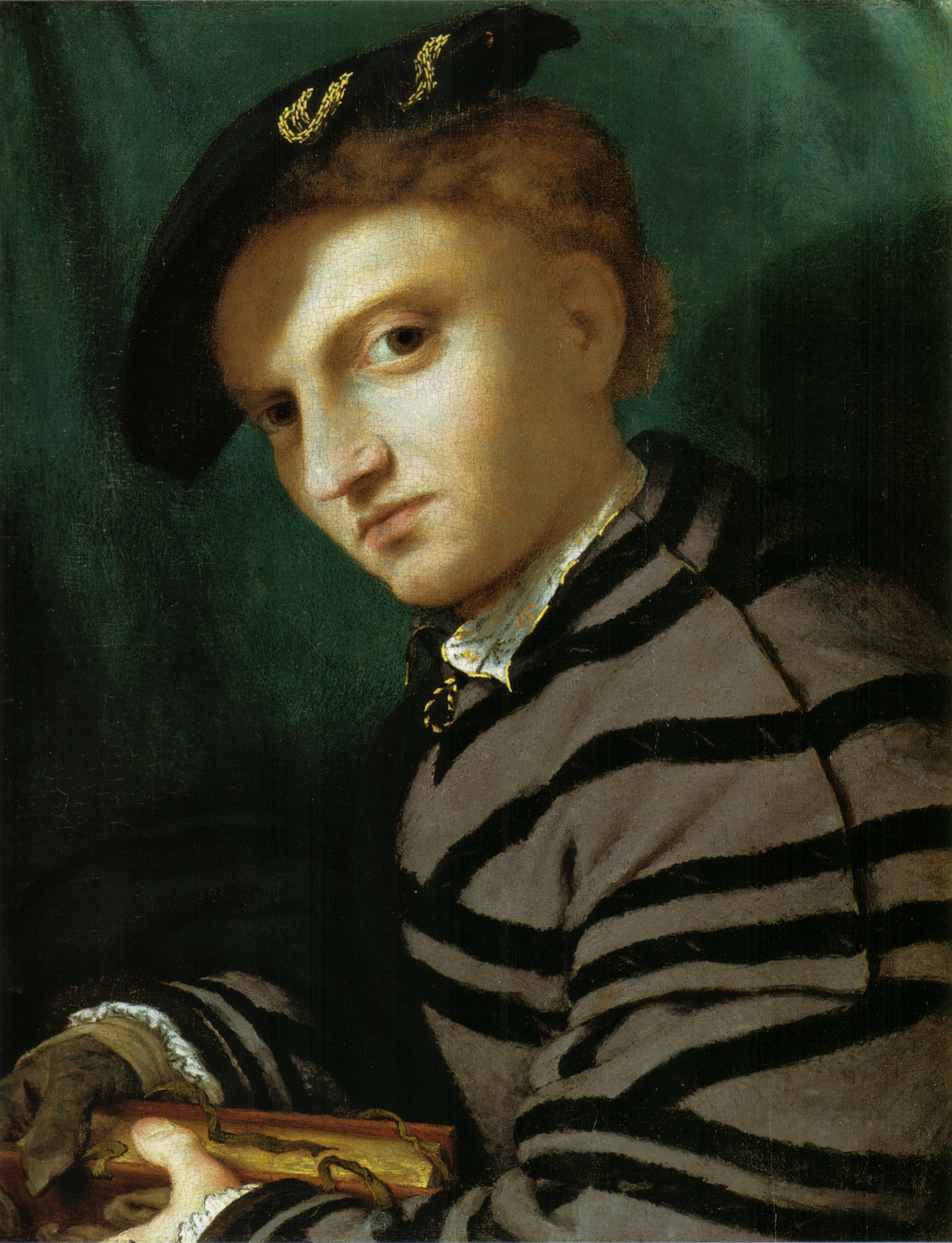
A Young Man with a Book
Lorenzo Lotto, 1526.

Trivulzio Madonna
Andrea Mantegna, 287 × 214 cm, 1497.

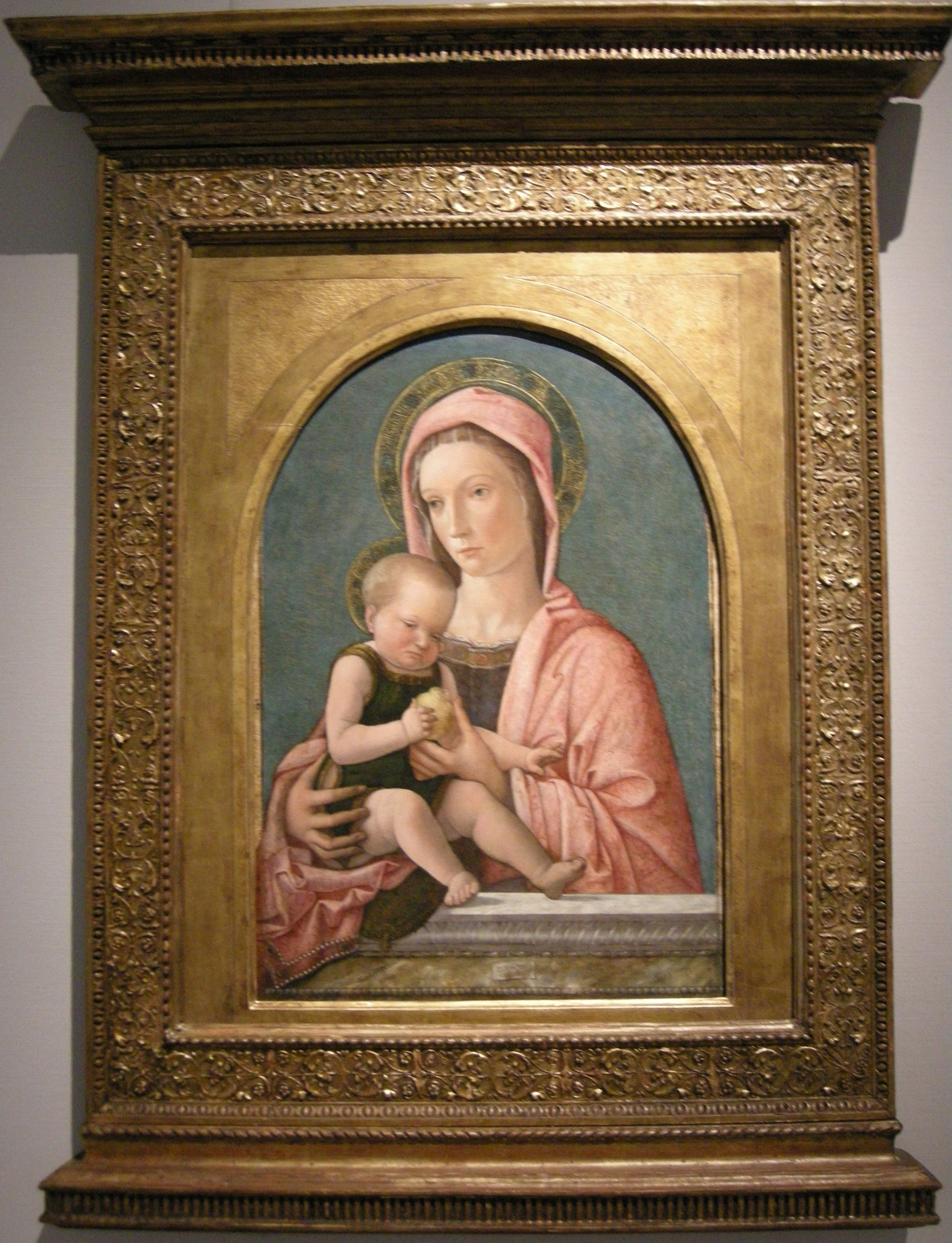
Madonna and Child
Giovanni Bellini, 1460–1465.

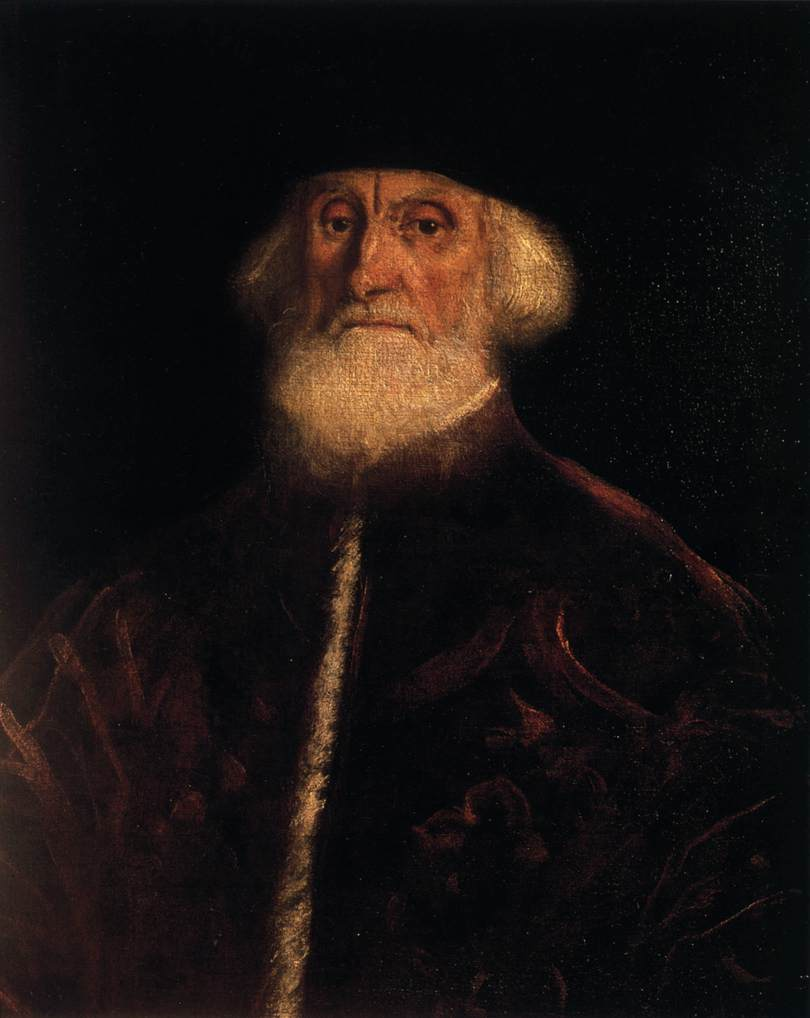
Portrait of Procurator Jacopo Soranzo
Tintoretto, 1550.

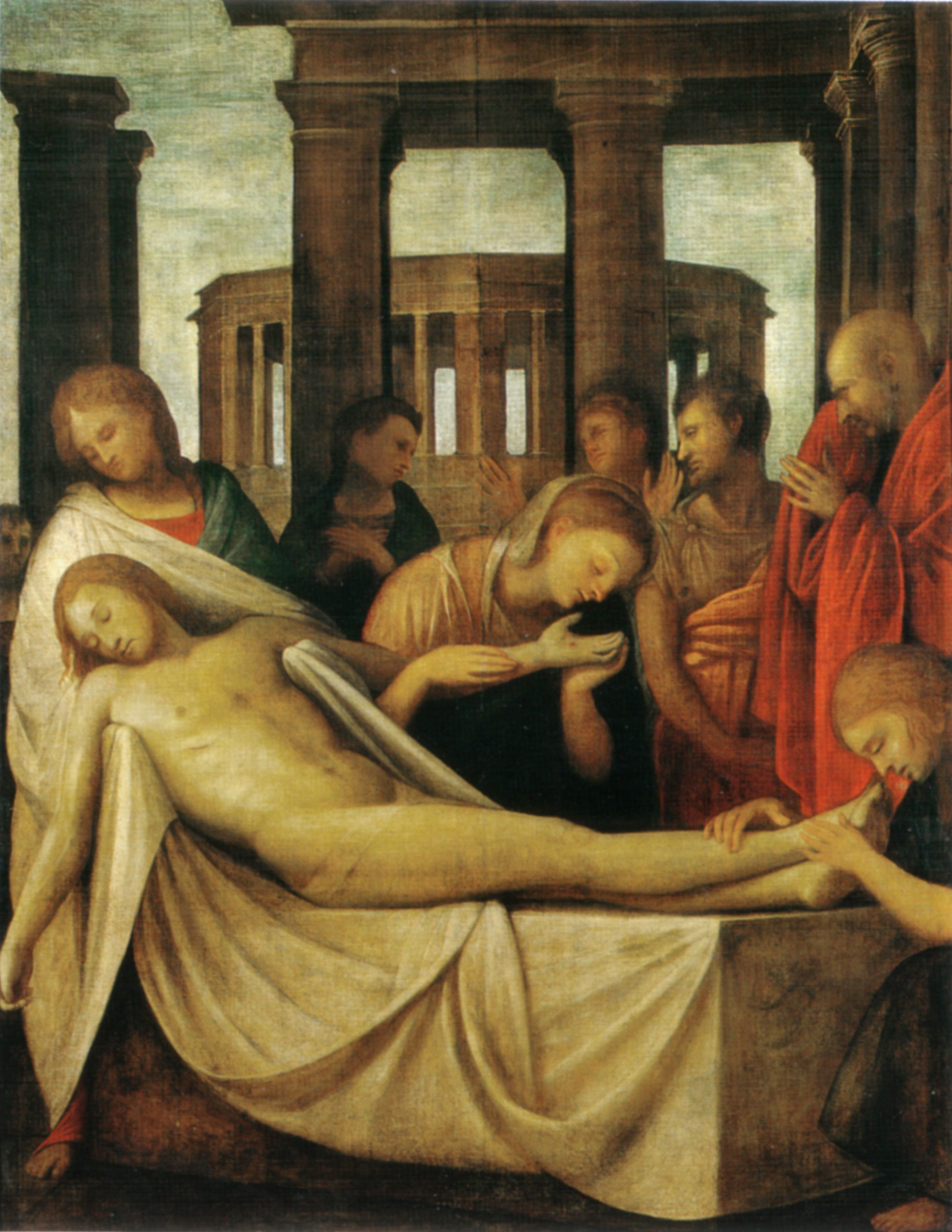
Lamentation over the Dead Christ
Bramantino, 214 × 104 cm, 1515–1520.

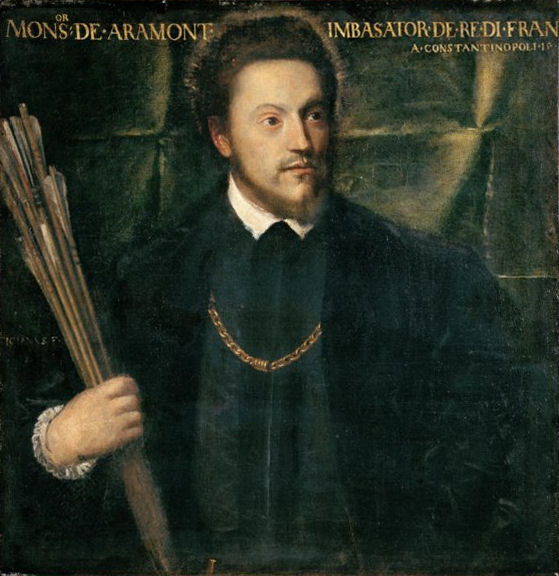
Portrait of Gabriel de Luetz d'Aramont
Titian, 1541–1542.

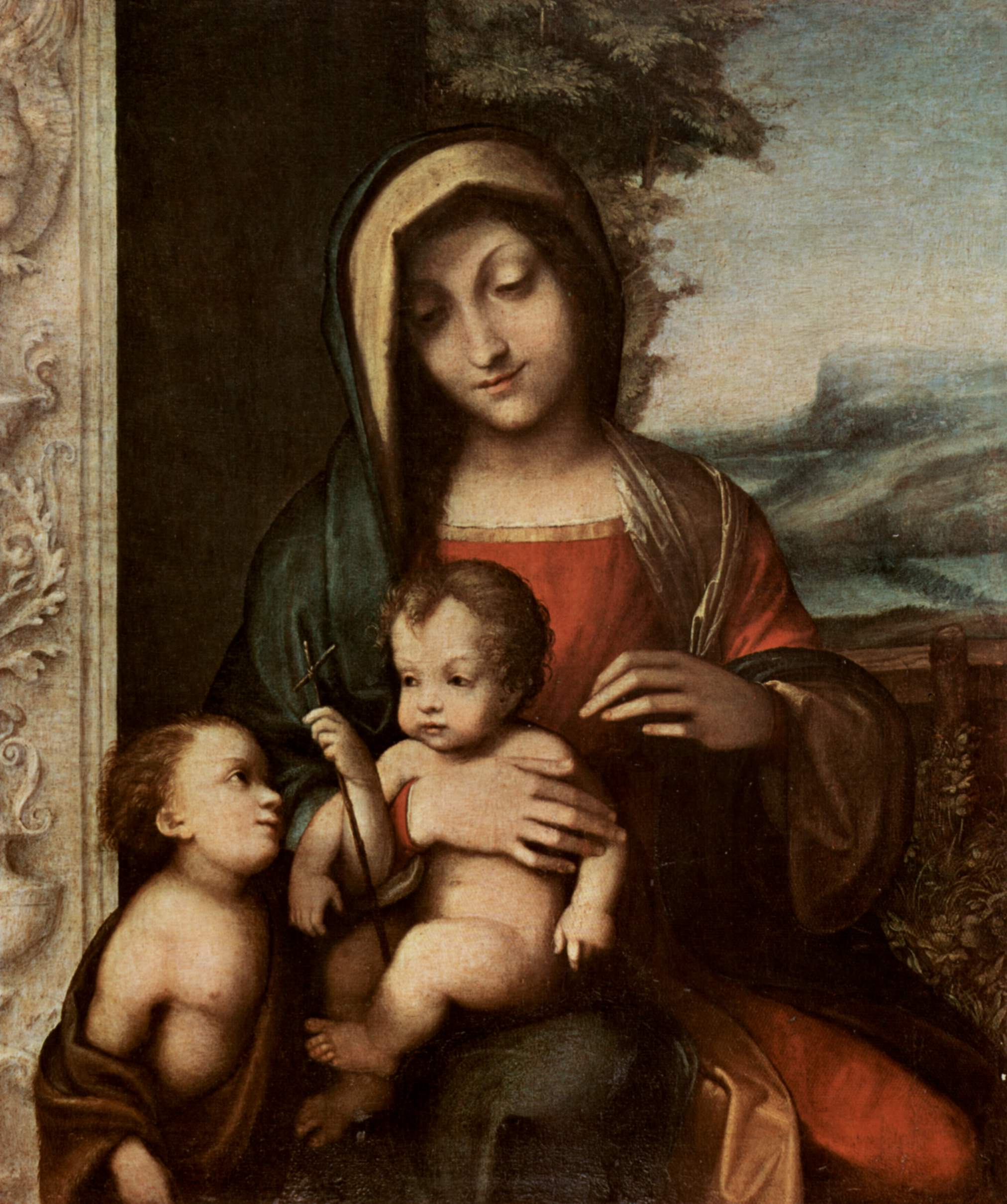
Bolognini Madonna
Correggio, 1517.

== Sources ==
- Le città d'arte: Milano (in Italian). Skira. 2008.
- Milano e provincia (in Italian). Touring Club Italiano. 2003.
