= Madonna and Child (Bellini, Milan, 1460–1465) =

Painting by Giovanni Bellini

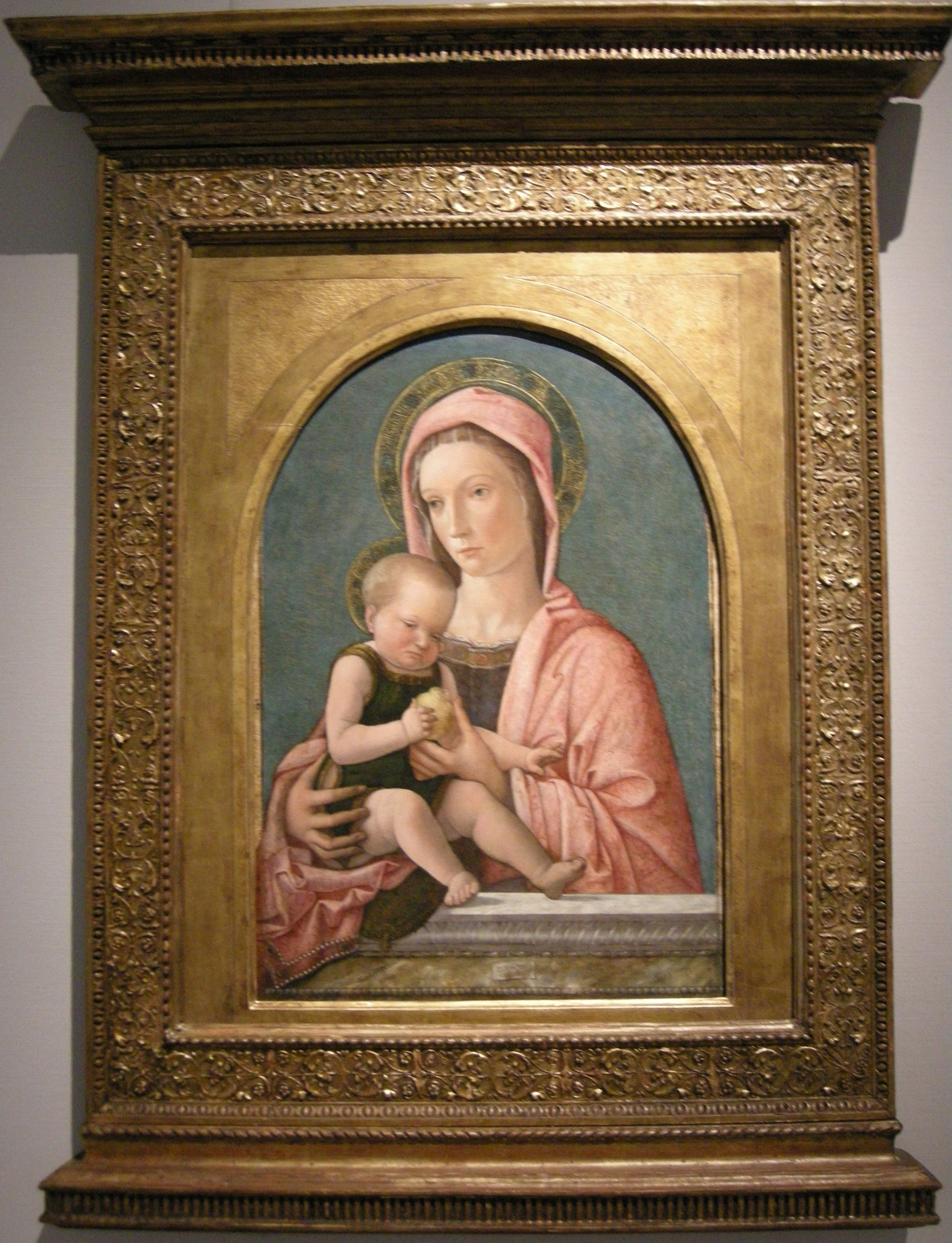
- Artist: Giovanni Bellini
- Year: 1460–1465
- Medium: tempera on panel
- Dimensions: 78 cm × 50 cm (31 in × 20 in)
- Location: Pinacoteca del Castello Sforzesco, Milan

Madonna and Child is a c. 1460–1465 tempera painting on panel by the Italian Renaissance artist Giovanni Bellini, signed on the trompe-l'œil parapet (IO[HANN]ES B[ELLI]N[US] F.). It dates from his early phase, when he was still strongly influenced by his father Jacopo and by Andrea Mantegna. The Christ Child holds a fruit, symbolising Original Sin and foreshadowing his Passion. Some art historians feel the haloes and drapery are too archaic for the work to be by Bellini, but the signature's authenticity was confirmed by a 1999 restoration.

It formed part of prince Luigi Alberico Trivulzio's collection, which was originally assigned to Turin in 1935. However, this was disputed by Milan and the work now hangs in Milan in the Pinacoteca del Castello Sforzesco.

== See also ==
- List of works by Giovanni Bellini
