= Trivulzio Madonna =

1497 painting by Andrea Mantegna

- Artist: Andrea Mantegna
- Year: 1497
- Medium: Tempera on canvas
- Dimensions: 287 cm × 214 cm (113 in × 84 in)
- Location: Pinacoteca del Castello Sforzesco; Milan

The Trivulzio Madonna is a painting by the Italian Renaissance painter Andrea Mantegna, executed in 1497. It is housed in the Pinacoteca of the Castello Sforzesco, Milan.

The work shows the Madonna and Child enthroned and surrounded by four saints; from left to right they are Saints John the Baptist, Gregory the Great, Benedict and Jerome. The cherubim surrounding the Madonna are a reference to the Annunciation. The branches of two citrus trees frame the upper register of the composition. The two figures in the foreground are portrayed in order to be observed from a lower position. In the lower centre are three busts of chanting angels around an organ, an allusion the Olivetan church of Santa Maria in Organo at Verona, for which the panel was executed.

The painting's current name comes from the Trivulzio Collection of Milan, to which it belonged from 1791 to 1935. A painting by Filippo Lippi is also known by this name.
