= Madonna and Child with Eight Saints =

Painting by Bramantino

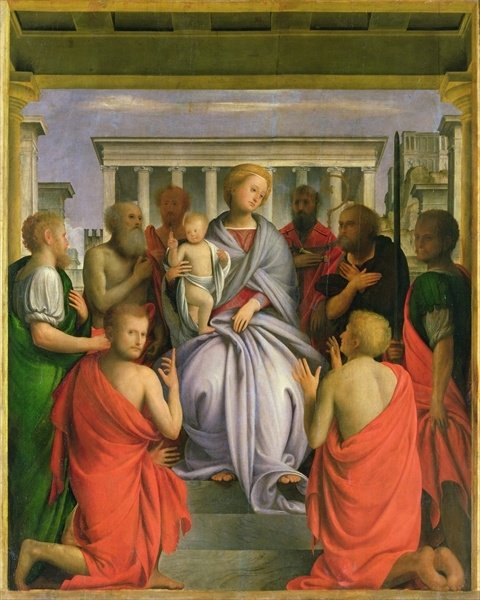
Madonna and Child with Eight Saints (c. 1515–1519) by Bramantino

Madonna and Child with Eight Saints is an oil painting on canvas of c. 1515–1520 by the Italian Renaissance painter and architect Bramantino, originally in the church of Santa Maria del Giardino in Milan and now in the Contini Bonacossi collection at the Uffizi in Florence. It belongs to the sacra conversazione genre.

Few of the saints hold attributes, making it difficult to identify them, though they might include John the Baptist (kneeling at the left and gesturing towards the Christ Child), Job or Saint Jerome (the bearded man with a bare torso), possibly Saint Ambrose (the bishop saint to the right) and Saint George or Saint Sebastian (the warrior saint with a long sword). An unknown monk saint is also shown.

The painting was created after the artist's Roman stay in 1508, as is evident in the reminiscence of classical architecture, and is usually dated to the last phase of the artist's activity, which extended to 1525, after which there is no further news of him.

== Description and style ==
Mary with the Child in her lap stands in the center beyond a short staircase, surrounded by eight saints arranged in a semicircle, in mostly symmetrical and contrapposto poses. The composition follows a pyramidal model, borrowed from Leonardo and Bramante, held back however by the horizontal scheme of the architecture, composed of a portico in the foreground, two straight and symmetrical curtains of pillars and a vast classical temple, with an ionic colonnade, which closes the proscenium in the centre, allowing a glimpse of some other buildings and a fortress on the sides.

Everything contributes to creating an atmosphere of suspended and intellectual unreality, starting from the simplification of the anatomical forms, the continuous references between the right and left halves (in the clothes, gestures and physical types of the saints), the lightened palette, and the complex illumination The light is in fact made complicated by the setting under a portico, with a source in front of the figures and one from behind, according to the research inaugurated in Milan by Leonardo da Vinci and carried forward, as well as by Bramantino himself, by Lorenzo Lotto (Martinengo Altarpiece, 1513–1516) and by Romanino (Pala di San Francesco di Brescia, 1517).
