= Portrait of a Man with a Book =

C.1522 painting by Correggio

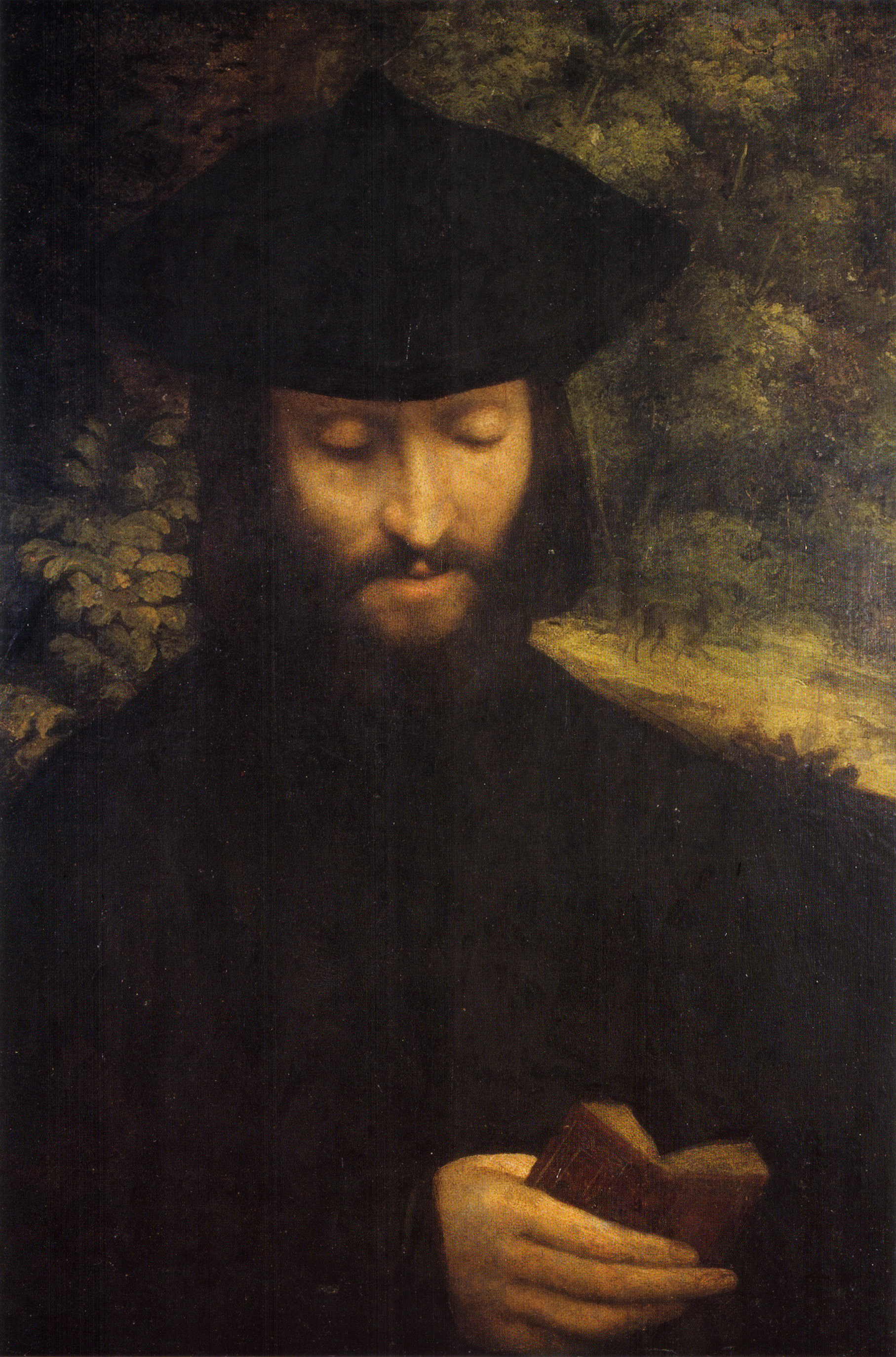
Portrait of a Man with a Book

Portrait of a Man with a Book is an oil on canvas painting by Correggio, dated to around 1522. It was bequeathed to the Pinacoteca del Castello Sforzesco in Milan (where it now hangs) in 1945 by Lydia Caprara Morando Attendolo Bolognini. It is sometimes instead attributed to Parmigianino but majority opinion is that it dates to Correggio's first mature period, which is supported by the fact that it was painted directly on top of the sketch, an informal technique suggesting it was made for a close friend of the artist.

It shows a man in a black coat and black cap three-quarter-length against a wooded background, reading from a tiny book held in his right hand, argued by Roberto Longhi to be a book of hours and by others such as Muzzi to be a Petrarchino (ie a miniature edition of Petrarch's Il Canzoniere). If it is the latter, the bee in the background may refer to poems CXC and CCCXIX of the work.

== Bibliography ==
- (in Italian) Giuseppe Adani, Correggio pittore universale, Silvana Editoriale, Correggio 2007. ISBN 9788836609772
- (in Italian) AA.VV., La Pinacoteca del Castello Sforzesco a Milano, Skira, Milano 2005. ISBN 88-7624-260-0
