= Noli me tangere (disambiguation) =

Noli me tangere ("do not touch me") is the Latin version of words spoken by Jesus to Mary Magdalene.

Noli me tangere may also refer to:

- Noli Me Tangere (Bernini), a sculptural arrangement in the church of Santi Domenico e Sisto, in Rome
- Noli me tangere (Bramantino), a c. 1500 painting
- Noli Me Tángere (novel) (1887), by José Rizal
  - Noli Me Tángere, a 1930 lost film adaptation of the novel
  - Noli Me Tangere (opera) (1957), opera based on Rizal's novel
  - Noli Me Tángere (film), a 1961 Philippine period drama film
- Noli me tangere (Titian), painted circa 1514
- Noli me tangere casket, a reliquary of the Aachen Cathedral Treasury, now destroyed
- Noli me tangere (Sustris)
- Noli me tangere (Correggio)

== See also ==
- Impatiens noli-tangere, a plant, touch-me-not balsam
