= Christus Dolens (Bramantino) =

Painting by Bramantino

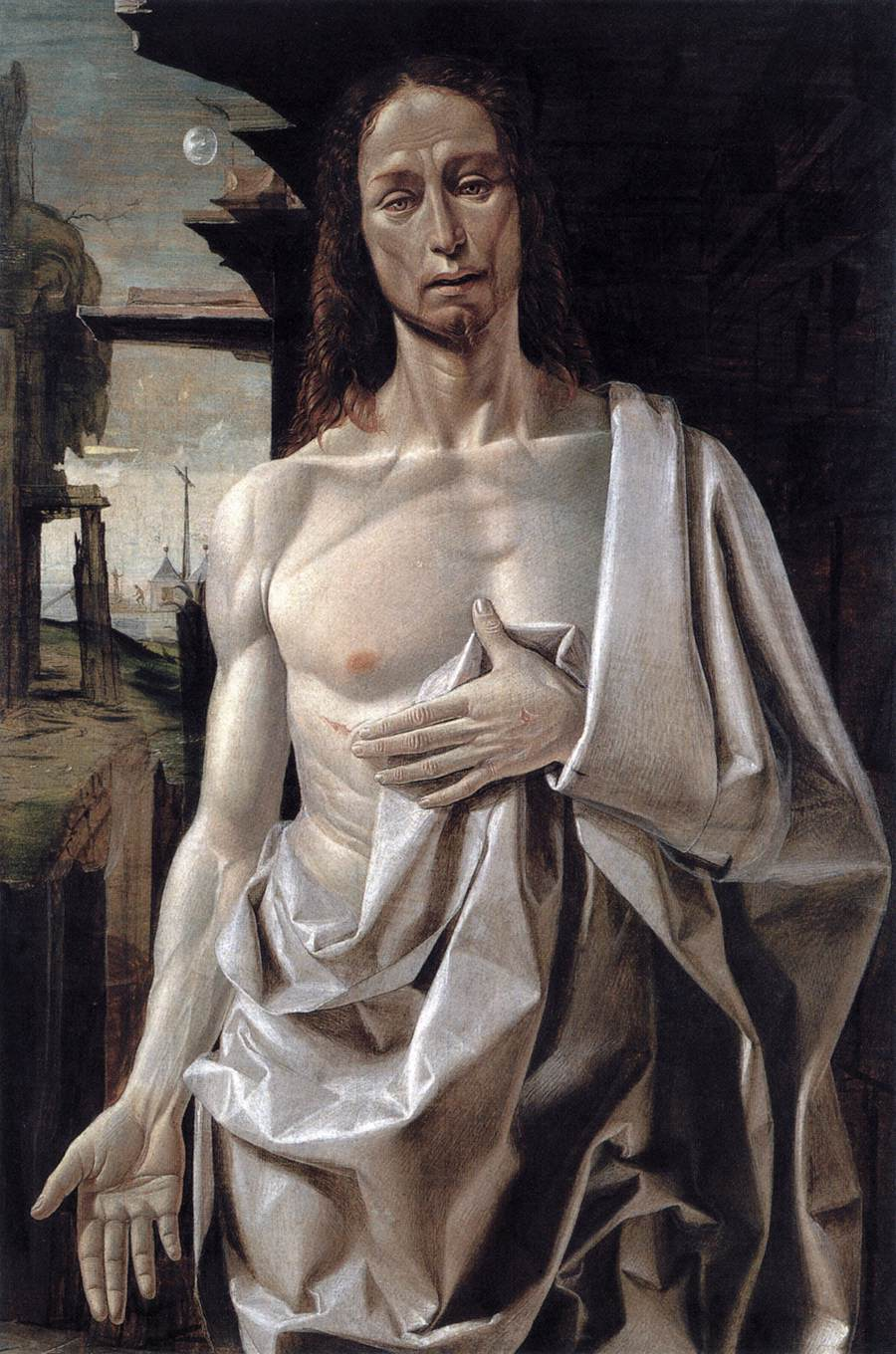
- Artist: Bramantino
- Year: c. 1490
- Medium: Tempera on panel
- Dimensions: 71 cm × 109 cm (28 in × 43 in)
- Location: Museo Thyssen-Bornemisza, Madrid

Christus Dolens, also known as Christ as the Man of Sorrows, is a tempera-on-panel painting by the Italian Renaissance painter and architect Bramantino, executed c. 1490, housed in the Museo Thyssen-Bornemisza in Madrid. The original Thyssen-Bornemisza Collection acquired it in 1937 from Countess Teresa Soranza-Mocenigo. A similar work by Bramantino is held in the Museo della Certosa in Pavia.

The painting was recorded in the Della Porta Pusterla family collection in Milan in 1590, where it remained until the first quarter of the 20th century. It was published for the first time by Müller Walde in 1898 and various studies attributed it to Bramantino or Bramante. In 1905, William Suida was the first to suggest an attribution to Bramantino. Mulazzini dated the painting to 1490, early in Bramantino's career.

== Description and style ==
The work represents Christ as a Man of Sorrows, frontal, half-length up to the knee, but it may also want to represent the Resurrection. Against the background of a ruined architecture (possibly the sepulcher) and a lunar landscape (with a river, trees and a sailing ship), the emaciated body of Christ stands out very close to the viewer, of a stony whiteness, wrapped in a mantle that draws deep creased paper-like folds, derived from the Nordic painting.

The figure shows the signs of martyrdom, with a graphic definition of the forms. Instead of the triumphant over death, Christ is depicted with red eyes, an almost ghostly pale body, depicted in detail, as shown in the tendons of the outstretched arm and muscles and chest. Bramantino employs the expression of Christ to focus the observer's attention on the sphere of emotions, such as austerity and compassion.
