= Pietà (Bramantino) =

Painting by Bramantino

Pietà or Lamentation over the Dead Christ
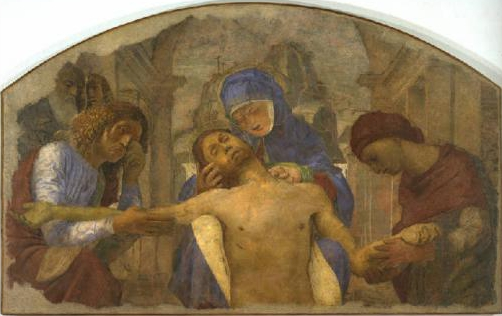
- Artist: Bramantino
- Year: c. 1475–1500
- Type: Fresco
- Subject: Lamentation over the Dead Christ
- Condition: Fragment of a lunette fresco
- Location: Pinacoteca Ambrosiana, Milan

Pietà or Lamentation over the Dead Christ is a fragment of a lunette fresco of c. 1475–1500 by the Italian Renaissance painter and architect Bramantino, originally over the door of the church of San Sepolcro in Milan and now in the Pinacoteca Ambrosiana in the same city.

The painting depicts the dead Christ held up by the Virgin Mary, with John the Evangelist and Mary Magdalene holding up his arms. To the left are Anthony the Great and another standing figure, whilst in the background is a perspective view suggestive of a basilica nave. At the center the architecture opens onto a view of Mount Calvary.

Despite the poor state of conservation due to exposure to the elements, the painting, in the surviving part, still shows descriptive refinements such as the transparent veils of color, the marked and diffused brightness, and the treatment of deep space. The influence of Bramante is evident, as is a spatiality inspired by Mantegna.
