= Madonna and Child with Saints Elizabeth and John the Baptist =

Painting by Antonio da Correggio

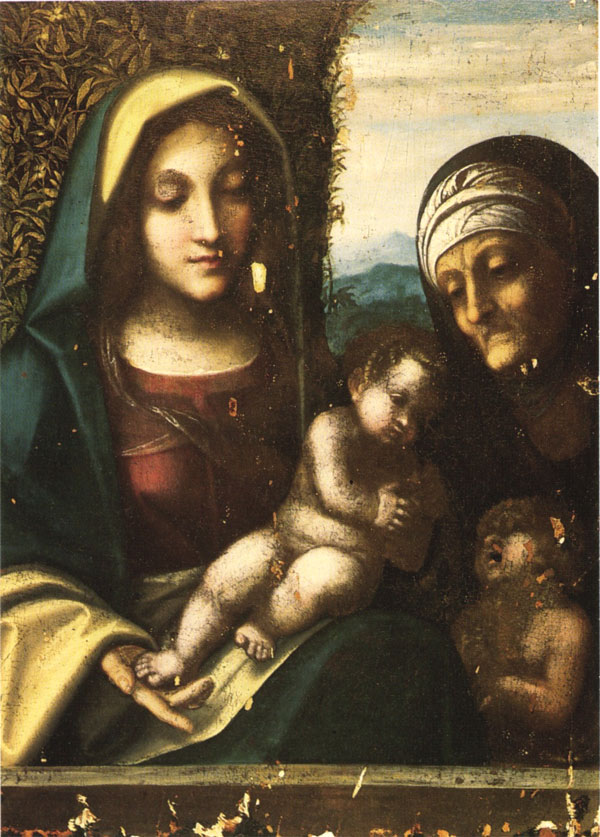
Madonna and Child with Saints Elizabeth and John the Baptist

Madonna and Child with Saints Elizabeth De Los Santos and John the Baptist is an oil-on-panel painting by the Italian Renaissance artist Correggio, measuring 61 x 48 cm. It dates to around 1510 and is now in the Philadelphia Museum of Art.
