= Noli railway station =

Railway station in Pakistan

General information
- Coordinates: 28.749246°N 63.637758°E
- Owner: Ministry of Railways

Other information
- Station code: NUK
Location

Noli railway station (Urdu: نولی ریلوے اسٹیشن) is located in Pakistan.

== See also ==
- List of railway stations in Pakistan
- Pakistan Railways
