= Albinea Madonna =

Lost painting by Correggio

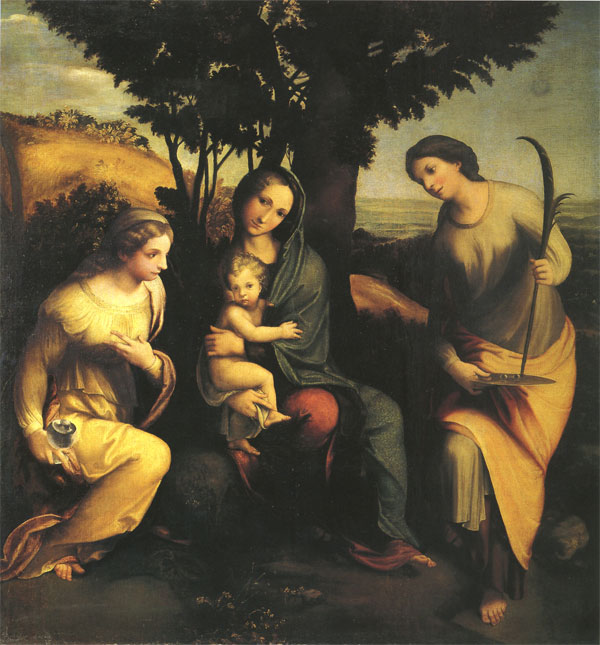
One of the copies of the work

The Albinea Madonna or Madonna of Albinea is a lost painting by the Italian Renaissance painter Correggio. The best surviving copy is a 16th-century one by Antonio Leto, from the church of San Rocco in Reggio Emilia and now in the Galleria Nazionale di Parma.

== History ==
There is much evidence for the commission on an "anchona" or altarpiece for the church of San Prospero, the parish church of Albinea, in the hills near Reggio Emilia. It is mentioned in a letter dated 12 May 1517 from its parish priest Giovanni Guidotti di Roncopò to Alessandro de' Malaguzzi. He found that much of the work on it was complete by that time and it was definitely completed 14 October 1519, when Correggio received his final payment for it. Another document dated 18 December that year mentions the "anchona de la nostra Dona d'Albinea" (the altarpiece of Our Lady at Albinea).

It was probably removed from its original location and replaced with a copy by Francesco I d'Este. It was given to the new Holy Roman Emperor Leopold I by Alfonso IV d'Este in 1657 and then vanished without trace.
