= Palazzo della Ragione Madonna =

Fresco by Bramantino

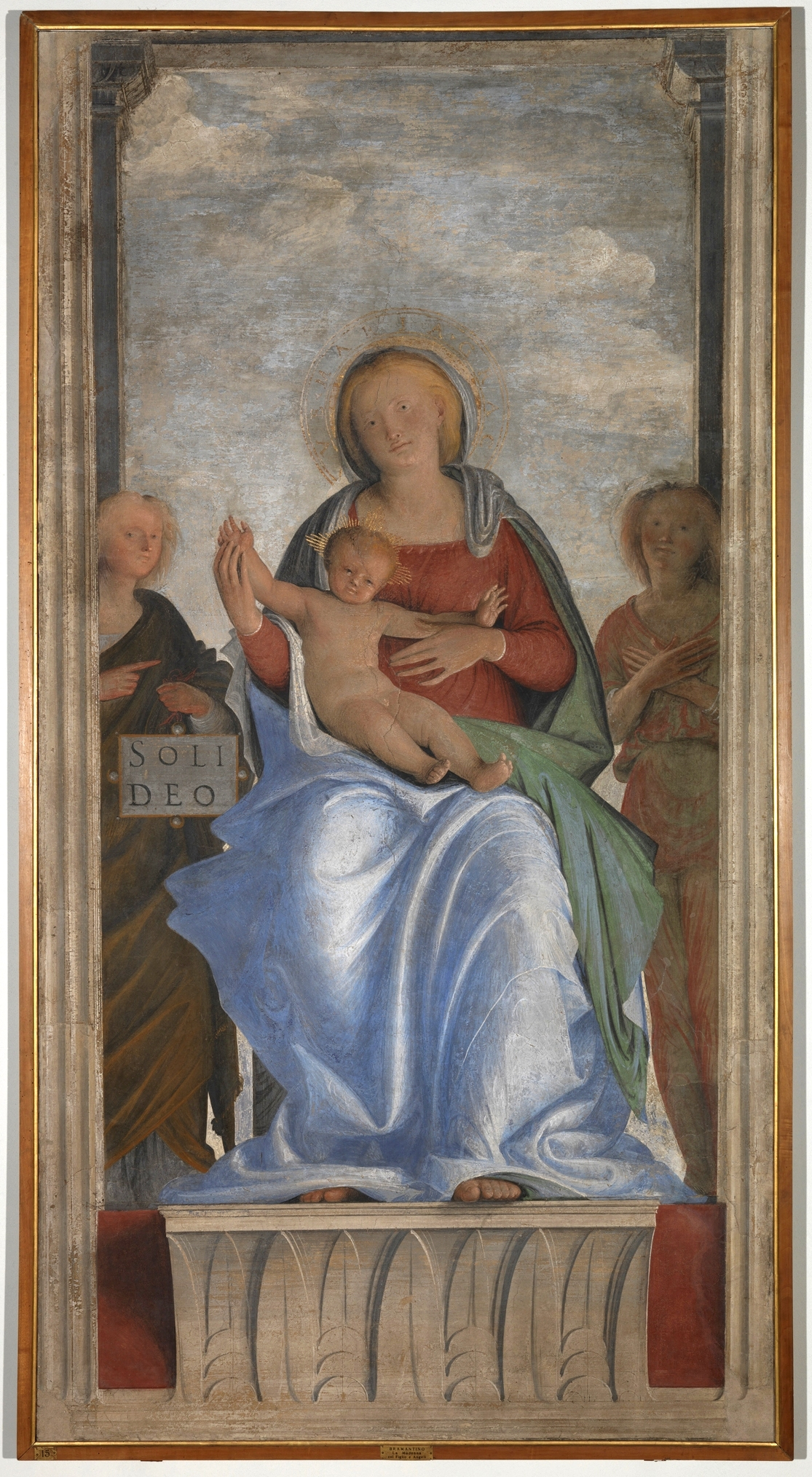
Palazzo della Ragione Madonna (c. 1509–1510) by Bramantino

The Palazzo della Ragione Madonna is a fragment of a fresco of c. 1509–1510 by the Italian Renaissance painter and architect Bramantino, originally on the façade of the Palazzo della Ragione, Milan, and now in the Pinacoteca di Brera in the same city. Due to a reference by Giovanni Paolo Lomazzo it was long misattributed to Bramante, until it entered its present home in 1808.

== Description and style ==
The Madonna and Child are depicted on a barely visible marble seat with a motif of lotus flowers. Mary is flanked by two angels, one of whom is holding a table with the writing "SOLI DEO". The effects of light are carefully studied: Mary's legs are illuminated by light from the right, which projects the shadow of the marble plinth and leaves the angel on the right in shadow.

The background is a blue sky veiled by clouds.
