= Adoration of the Christ Child (Bramantino) =

Painting by Bramantino

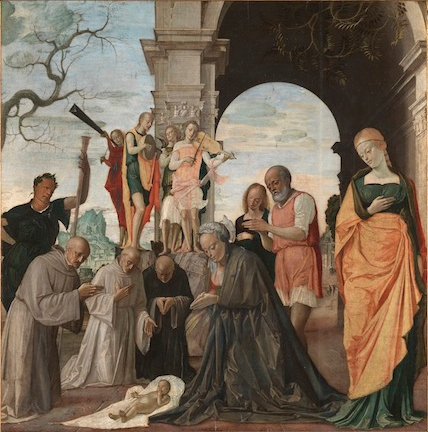
- Artist: Bramantino
- Year: c. 1485
- Medium: Tempera and oil on panel
- Dimensions: 86 cm × 85 cm (34 in × 33 in)
- Location: Biblioteca Ambrosiana; Milan

Adoration of the Christ Child is a painting in tempera and oils of c. 1485 by the Italian Renaissance painter and architect Bramantino in the Biblioteca Ambrosiana, Milan.

== Description ==
Produced for an unknown commissioner from Milan, it shows the Christ Child being adored by the kneeling figures of Bernardino of Siena (recognisable by his grey Franciscan habit), Francis of Assisi (with his stigmata), Benedict of Nursia (in a black Benedictine habit) and the Virgin Mary. Behind them is a group of angel musicians standing on a column base. On the far left and right of the painting are the emperor Augustus and a sibyl in standing poses based on that of the Pothos sculpture. Their presence and that of a Roman arch in the background refer to a passage in the Golden Legend (1.40) in which a sibyl prophesies to Augustus that his Temple of Peace in Rome would crumble the day a virgin gave birth.
