= Bramantino =

Italian painter

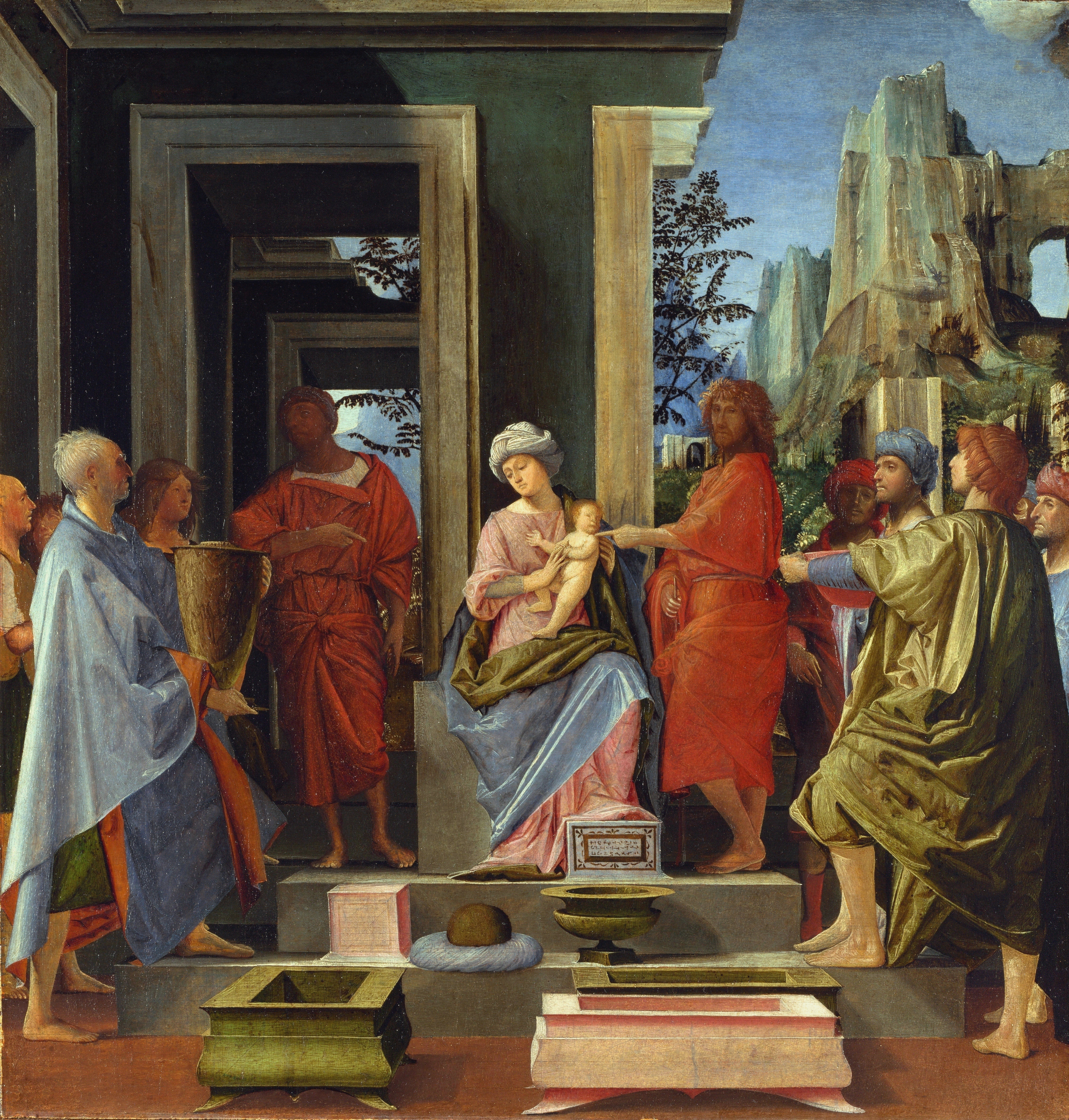
- Bramantino, Adoration of the Magi, National Gallery, London, c. 1500
- Born: Bartolomeo Suardi c. 1456; Milan
- Died: c. 1530
- Known for: Painting, architecture

Bartolomeo Suardi (c. 1456 – c. 1530) was an Italian painter and architect, mainly active in his native Milan.

== Biography ==
He was born in Milan, the son of Alberto Suardi, but his biography remains unclear, and was long complicated by two "Pseudo-Bramantinos". He was trained by Donato Bramante, adopting a diminutive form of his master's name. This training gave him influences from by the Urbino quattrocento tradition of immobile realism, and later he assimilated some elements of the style of Leonardo, after he arrived in Milan, although in other respects he remained faithful to his training in the style of Central Italy.

He is documented in late 1508 as helping in the decoration of the Vatican Stanze though nothing remains of his work there, and by 1509 he was back in Milan. His style changed considerably during his career, and also shows strongly individual traits. His main influences were the serene and sometimes unnatural quietist classicism of Piero della Francesca, Leonardo da Vinci, and Ercole de' Roberti, but his works also display a sometimes disquieting immobile expressiveness comparable only to the last of these three.

He acted as an architect and advisor on the reconstruction of the Duomo of Milan in the years before his death.

== The "Pseudo-Bramantinos" ==
There is a mention of a Bramantino da Milano by Vasari in his biographies of Piero della Francesca, Il Garofalo, Girolamo da Carpi, and Jacopo Sansovino. The Bramantino of Vasari, if he existed at all, worked for Pope Nicholas V between 1450 and 1455. If so, then he worked prior to the cited works of Bartolomeo Suardi.

An artist long known as the pseudo-Bramantino was active in Naples in the early 16th century; he is now usually identified as a Spaniard, called Pedro Fernández, Piero Francione, or various other names.

== Mature works ==
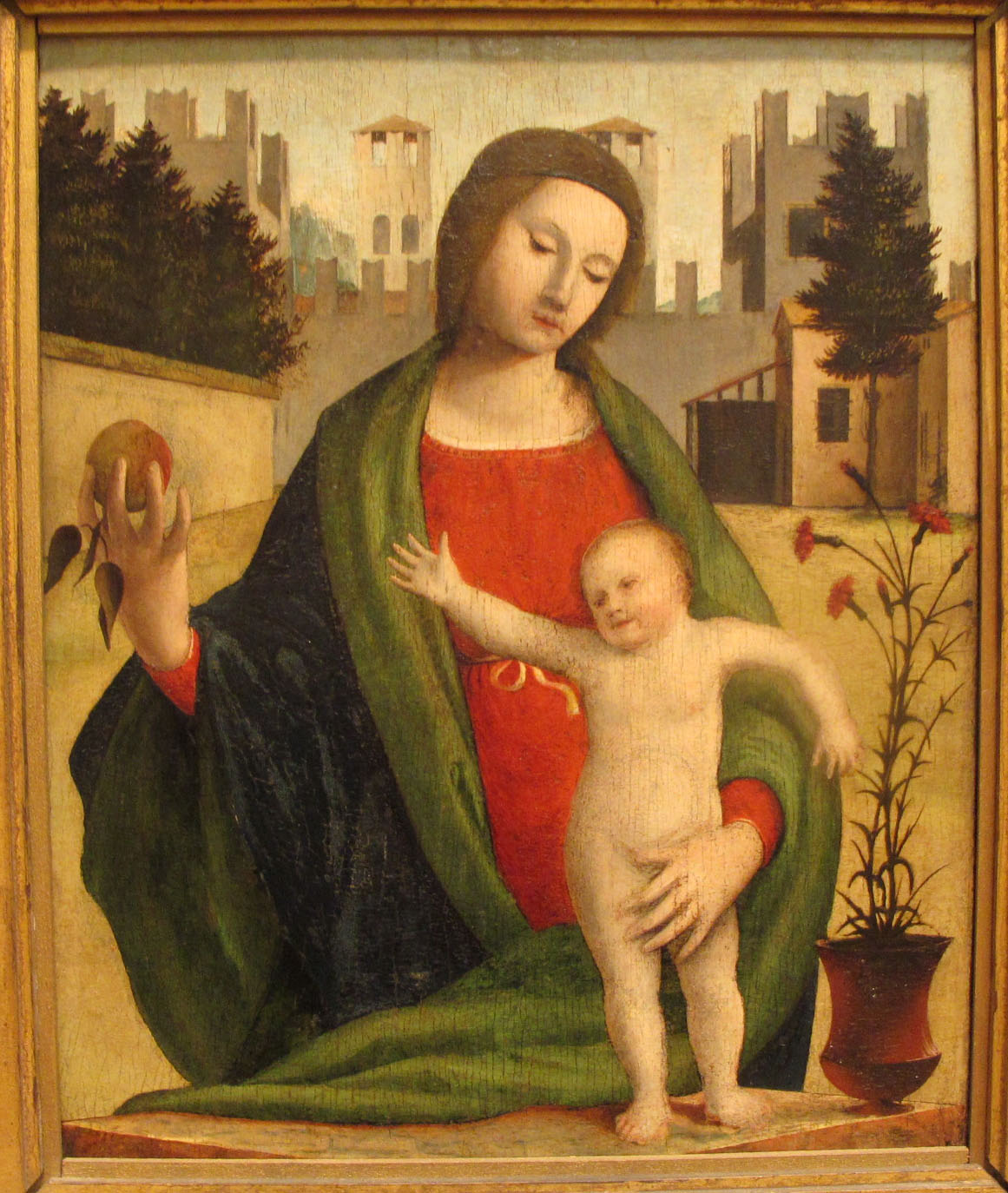
Bramantino, Madonna and Child, probably before 1508

In 1508 he was engaged in Rome. Donato Bramante taught Bramantino architecture, and the pupil assisted the master in the execution of the interior of the church of Santa Maria presso San Satiro, Milan.

In painting, he executed a number portraits of celebrated personages for the Vatican. His earliest known works are a Nativity (1490s, Brera) and an Christus Dolens (c. 1495, Museo Thyssen-Bornemisza, Madrid). One of his best known works is somber Adoration of the Magi (1495–98), in the National Gallery of London. In addition to the impassive, emotion-dry classicism, and the symmetric geometric logic of purity, this figure is notable for the imaginative cut-away of the building revealing a fanciful mountain backdrop.

A Pietà fresco (c. 1505, now in Ambrosiana) is in fragmentary state. Before 1508, he designed the tapestries of the Months for Gian Giacom Trivulzio (now in Castello Sforzesco). The Saint Michael Altar (or Enthroned Madonna and child with Saint Ambrogio and Saint Michael) at the Biblioteca Ambrosiana, notable for the foreshortened slain man (representing an Arian heretic") before a tough-looking Saint Ambrose and giant dead frog (symbolizing Satan) with Saint Michael in the foreground and impassive saints, dates to after 1510. Freedberg sees in this painting a Leonardo-based impulse to circumscribe the painting to a world where near-abstract rigorous geometry, characterized by "looming silhouettes of imagined and unpeopled architecture, constructed with a rule and square, take increasing prominence." The figures, even when trying to betray emotion, appear vacant, distant, "automata" confined as pawns to a geometric exercise, something in common with Piero della Francesca's earlier works. Another masterpiece is the Brera Crucifixion (c. 1510–1520).

In 1525 Bramantino was appointed architect to the court by Duke Francis (II) Sforza, and his aid as an engineer in the defence of Milan brought him a multitude of rewards.

== See also ==
- Adoration of the Christ Child (Bramantino), c. 1485
- Madonna del palazzo della Ragione c. 1509
