= Christ at the Column (disambiguation) =

Christ at the Column refers to the flagellation of Christ.

Christ at the Column may also refer to:

- Christ at the Column (Bramante), a painting attributed to Donato Bramante
- Christ at the Column (Caravaggio), a painting by Caravaggio
- Christ at the Column (Antonello da Messina), a 1475 painting by Antonello da Messina
- Christ at the Column (Gregorio Fernández), a sculpture by Gregorio Fernández
