= Great hall (disambiguation) =

A great hall is the main room of a royal palace, nobleman's castle or large manor house.

Great Hall may also refer to:

- Great Hall of the People, Tiananmen Square, Beijing
- Great Hall of the University of Leeds, England
- Great Hall of the University of Sydney, Australia
- Great Hall of Università Cattolica del Sacro Cuore, Italy
- The Great Hall, Toronto, Canada
- Cooper Union's Foundation Building's Great Hall, New York
- Volkshalle (Große Halle) the domed architectural centerpiece of the planned, but never built, renewal of the German capital Berlin during the Nazi period
- Great Hall, Union Station (Toronto), Canada
