= Tempietto del Bramante =

Tomb in Rome, Italy

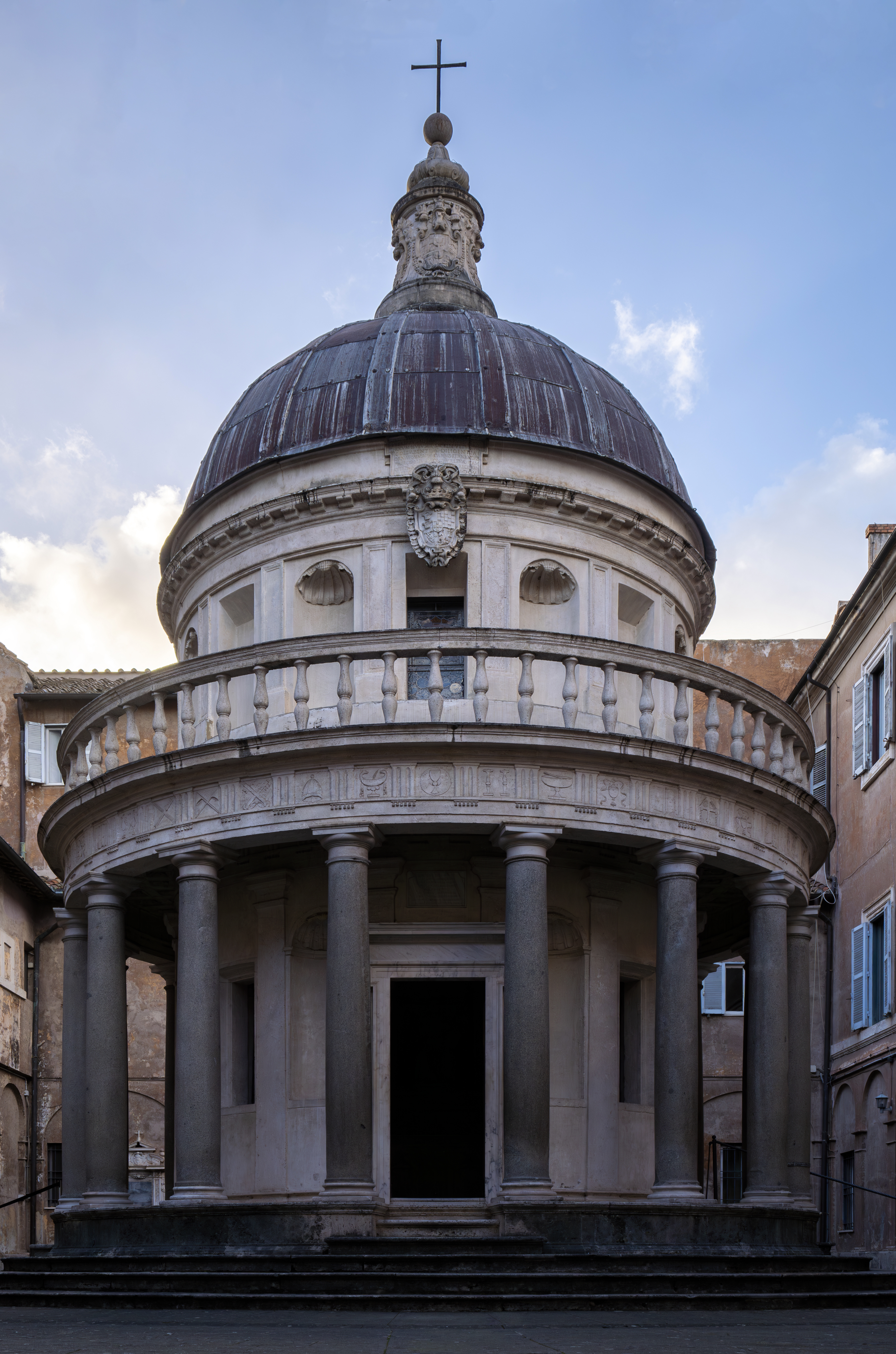
- Interactive map of the Tempietto del Bramante area

General information
- Architectural style: High Renaissance
- Location: Rome, Italy
- Coordinates: 41.88875°N 12.46641°E
- Completed: c. 1502

Design and construction
- Architect: Donato Bramante

The Tempietto del Bramante is a martyrium designed by Donato Bramante to commemorate the site traditionally regarded as the location of Saint Peter’s crucifixion. The small, freestanding chapel was commissioned by Ferdinand II of Aragon and Isabella I of Castile and was completed c. 1502 for the cloister of San Pietro in Montorio in Rome, Italy. The structure is considered a masterpiece of High Renaissance architecture, with scholars and architects noting Bramante’s harmonious proportions and his symbolic adaptation of Classical and early Christian architectural elements.

== History ==
After spending his first years in Milan, Bramante moved to Rome, where he was recognized by Cardinal Giuliano della Rovere, the soon-to-be Pope Julius II. In Rome, Bramante was able to study the ancient monuments firsthand. The temple of Vesta at Tivoli was one of the precedents behind the Tempietto. Other antique precedents Bramante was able to study in Rome include the circular temple of the banks of the Tiber, Temple of Hercules Victor, believed at the time to be a temple of Vesta. However, circular churches had already been employed by early Christians for martyriums, like Santa Costanza, also in Rome. Bramante would have been aware of these early Christian precedents, and as a result, the Tempietto is circular.

== Description ==
The temple was constructed from bearing masonry. The circular temple supports a classical entablature, and was framed in the shadowy arch of the cloister. It is the earliest example of the Tuscan order in the Renaissance. The Tuscan is a form of the Doric order, well suited for strong male gods (such as Hercules) so Tuscan was well suited for St. Peter's. It is meant to mark the traditional exact spot of St. Peter's martyrdom, and is an important precursor to Bramante's rebuilding of St. Peter's.

The building reflected Brunelleschi's style. It is composed of slender Tuscan columns, a Doric entablature modeled after the ancient Theatre of Marcellus, and a dome. Bramante planned to surround the building with concentric rings of colonnades, the columns of which would have been radially aligned to those of the Tempietto, but this plan was never executed.
