= Cloisters of Sant'Ambrogio =

The Cloisters of Sant'Ambrogio in Milan were designed by Bramante in 1497. From October 1930 these cloisters are headquarters of Università Cattolica del Sacro Cuore.

== History ==
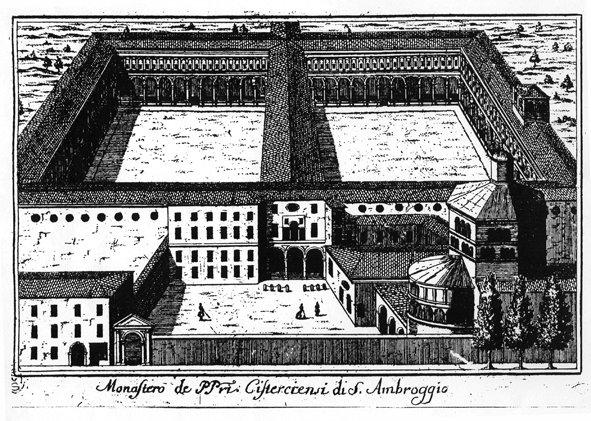
Eighteenth-century engraving of Marc'Antonio Dal Re

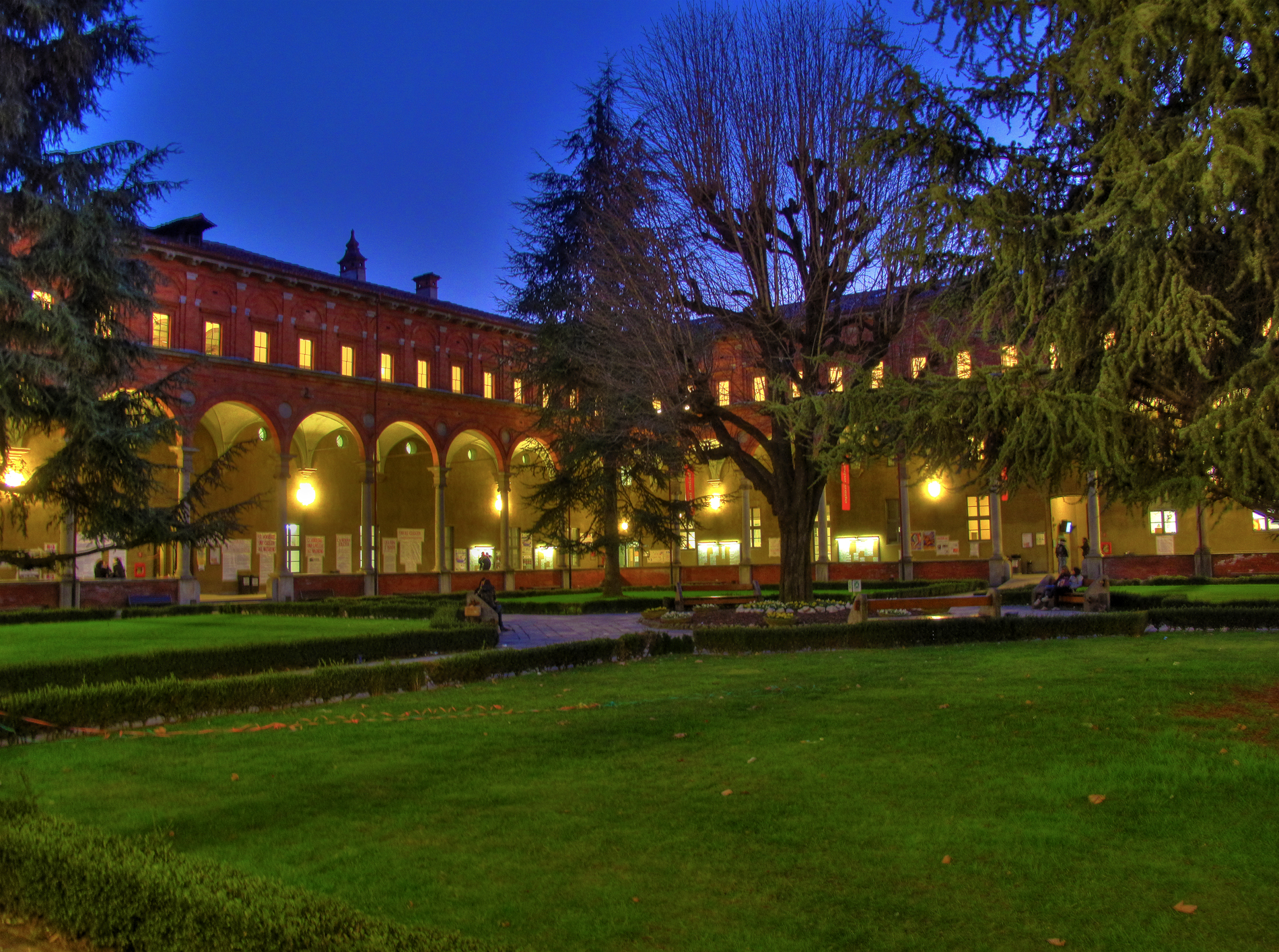
A cloister

Agostino Gemelli bought the old monastery of Sant'Ambrogio, freed from the transfer of the military hospital, which until then had been housed there. The convent, which stretched on the right side of the basilica of Sant'Ambrogio, was built by Benedictine monks in the eighth century and was sold in the fifteenth century by Cardinal Ascanio Sforza, brother of Ludovico il Moro, the Cistercian monks of Clairvaux.

The cardinal ordered at that time to Bramante reconstruction of the monastery. The project involved a large square with four cloisters, but only two were built: the cloister ion (as close to the church) was built under the direction of Cristoforo Solari until 1513, and the Doric cloister, built in 1620-1630 on Bramante model.

When it became the seat of Cattolica, Father Gemelli entrusted the restoration Giovanni Muzio (who also designed the Triennale di Milano), who worked for about twenty years, from 1928 to late forties, also passing through the destruction caused by the bombing of 'August 1943 and the subsequent reconstruction.

Notable is the restoration of the cloisters by Bramante; century refectory of the former became Great Hall, where he wanted to, on the Brera, the wall fresco by Callisto Piazza (1545) inspired by the Wedding at Cana, the library and chapel, with modulated by high walls sculptures Manzù.

The expansion of the complex started in the eighties led to significant archaeological surprises. First came to light remains of the Roman necropolis (first and third century) that occupied this area, just outside the walls of the urban settlement of Mediolanum, then, the most significant find: a large circular brick structure dating from the late sixteenth or the early seventeenth century, which was identified with the ice of the Cistercian monastery, the "la conserva de giazzo" spoken of by contemporary documents Sforza. The unique structure is now visible in the classroom dedicated to the underground philosopher Gustavo Bontadini.

== Structure ==
The two cloisters characterized respectively by the order Doric and Ionic order (still unusual at that time), have arches unusually high 7.5 meters. This solution will be successful as a type since it was particularly suited to accommodate both large rooms on two levels, such as cafeterias and libraries, both cells for the monks on two floors. The plug body between the two cloisters, in the sixteenth century was built a large dining hall.

== See also ==
- Università Cattolica del Sacro Cuore
- Basilica of Sant'Ambrogio
