= Great Hall of Università Cattolica del Sacro Cuore =

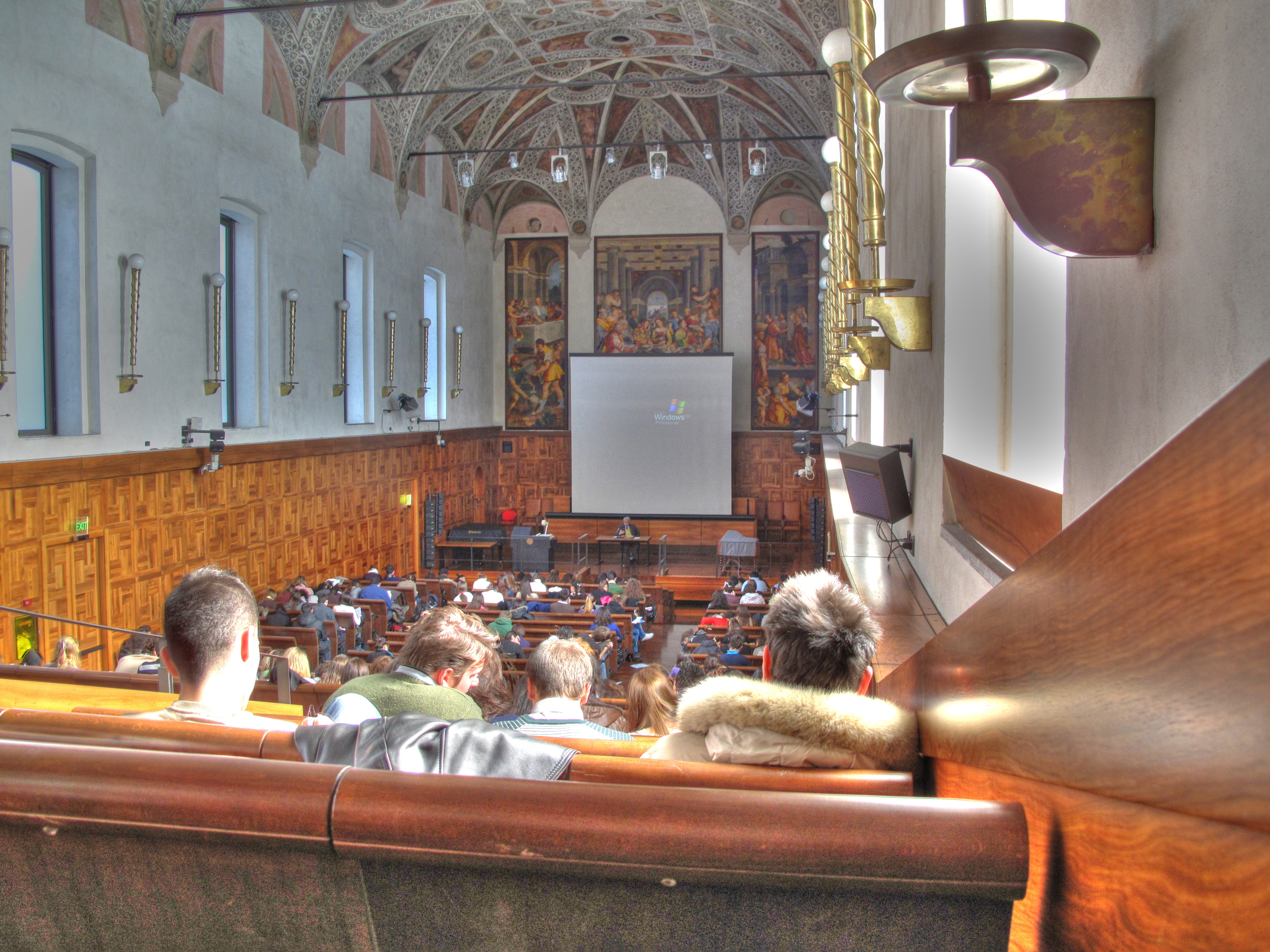
UCSC Great Hall

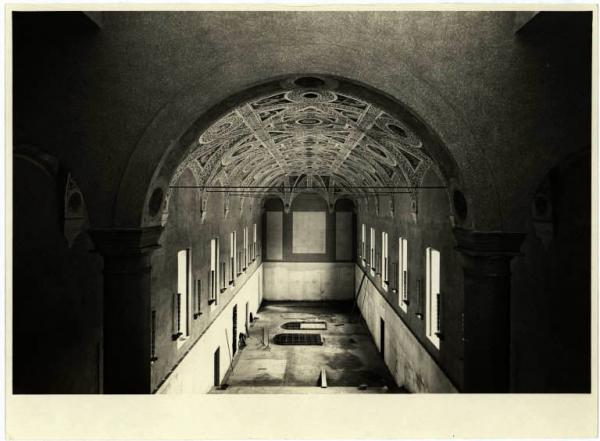
Great Hall before restoration

The Great Hall of Università Cattolica del Sacro Cuore, Italy, is one of the principal structures of the University, with a public interior used for formal ceremonies, conferences, recitals and lessons.

== History ==
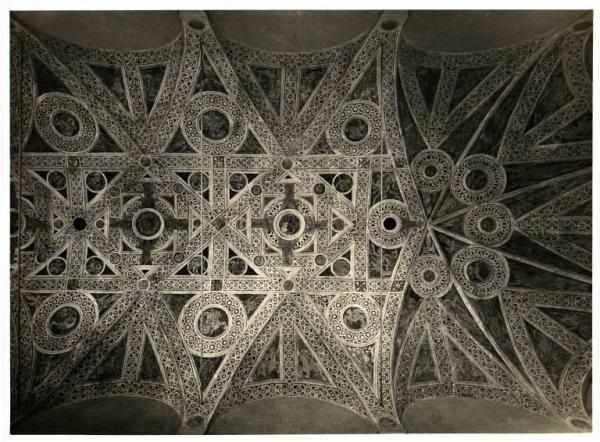
Ceiling of the Great Hall

Bramante projected the two Cloisters of Sant'Ambrogio and between them built a refectory. The refectory was painted by Callisto Piazza, who provident in 1545 to adorn the wall with a magnificent fresco, still visible, showing the "Wedding at Cana". The facade and the statue of Christ the King are recent additions designed by the architect Muzio. Since the 1930s the hall has undergone a major restoration to be used as the great hall of UCSC.

== Function ==
The great hall is one of the main structures of the university. In addition to this main hall, there are others located in the satellite campuses in (Rome, Brescia, Piacenza and Campobasso). Every year in this room there is the inauguration of the academic year. International conferences are also held here and have featured participants like Mario Draghi, Romano Prodi, Tony Blair, Mario Monti, Giorgio Napolitano, José Manuel Barroso and others.

== See also ==
- Università Cattolica del Sacro Cuore
- Callisto Piazza
