= Martyrium =

Church or shrine built over the tomb of a Christian martyr

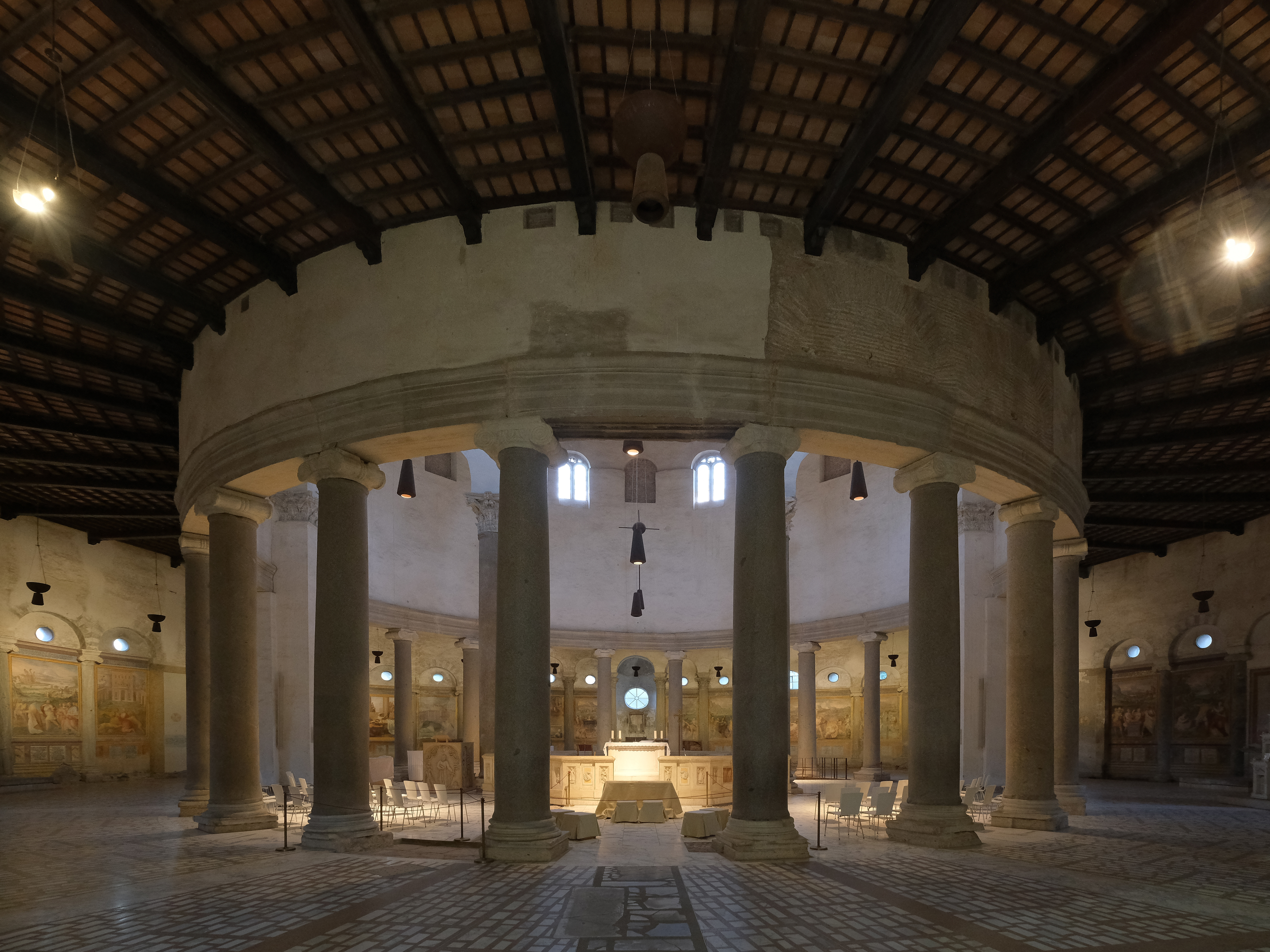
The largely 5th-century interior of Santo Stefano Rotondo in Rome

A martyrium (Latin) or martyrion (Greek) (pl.: martyria), sometimes anglicized martyry (pl.: "martyries"), is a church or shrine built over the tomb of a Christian martyr. It is associated with a specific architectural form, centered on a central element and thus built on a central plan, that is, of a circular or sometimes octagonal or cruciform shape.

== Etymology ==
The origin of the name of the Christian martyrium is as follows: Ancient Greek martys, "witness", to martyrion, "testimony", to Late and Ecclesiastical Latin martyrium.

== History ==
The oldest Christian martyria were built at "a site which bears witness to the Christian faith, either by referring to an event in Christ's life or Passion, or by sheltering the grave of a martyr". Martyria, mostly small, were very common after the early 4th century, when Constantine and his co-ruler, Licinius, became the first Roman emperors to declare religious tolerance for Christianity in the Roman Empire (Edict of Milan, 313 AD). Martyria had no standard architectural plan, and are found in a wide variety of designs. There was often a sunken floor, or part of it, to bring the faithful closer to the remains of the saint, and a small opening, the fenestella, going from the altar-stone to the grave itself.

Later churches began to bring the relics of saints to the church, rather than placing the church over the grave; the first translation of relics was in Antioch in 354, when the remains of Saint Babylas, which were in a sarcophagus, were moved to a new church.

== Development ==
The architectural form of the martyrium was developed from Roman architecture, mainly based on imperial mausolea. Constantine the Great applied this style to the tomb of Jesus at the Anastasis in Jerusalem (c. 326–380s) and the Apostles' Church in Constantinople, while also erecting round mausolea for himself and his daughters. The first step towards creating a church based on an imperial mausoleum was made around 320, when Constantine connected what was meant to become his own mausoleum with a church structure.

The same form was later adopted by early Islamic architecture, which employed it in the creation of a shrine known as the Dome of the Rock in Jerusalem, built much in the style of the Constantinian rotunda of the Church of the Holy Sepulchre, with which it was meant to create a "dialog of shrines", while standing at a prominent, isolated position – the Temple Mount.

The central-plan martyrium church became a model for important churches not containing important relics, such as the Constantinian "Golden Octagon" at Antioch, and perhaps also the octagonal church of Caesarea Maritima (built c. 480–500), the San Vitale in Ravenna (526–547), and the Palatine Chapel in Aachen (c. 792–805).

== Examples ==
Martyria that remain in something like their original form include the following:

- The 4th-century core of the much expanded St. Gereon's Basilica, Cologne
- A building with three apses over the Catacomb of Callixtus in Rome
- Santo Stefano Rotondo, Rome, late 5th century
- Basilica of San Lorenzo, Milan, perhaps 4th century, although the oldest part of the church now evident is an adjoining Imperial mausoleum of the 4th century (compare Santa Costanza in Rome)
- Church of the Holy Sepulchre, Jerusalem (4th century), on the most important Christian site of all, founded by Constantine
- Church of Saint Simeon Stylites, Syria, 5th century, also very large, now in ruins
- Church of the Seat of Mary or Kathisma, 5th century, on the road between Jerusalem and Bethlehem

Other celebrated Martyria include:

- The Martyrium of Saint Denis, Montmartre
- The Martyrium of Saint Hripsime in the city of Vagharshapat (Etchmiadzin), Armenia
- The San Pietro in Montorio, Rome, Italy, which includes in its courtyard the Tempietto, a small commemorative martyrium built by Donato Bramante

== See also ==
- Altar stone
- Symbolism of domes

== Bibliography ==
- Eduard Syndicus; Early Christian Art, Burns & Oates, London, 1962
- Eastman, David L. (2019). "Martyria". In Pettegrew, David K.; Caraher, William R.; Davis, Thomas W. (eds.). The Oxford Handbook of Early Christian Archaeology. Oxford University Press. ISBN 978-0-19-936904-1.
