= San Pietro in Montorio =

- Chiesa di San Pietro in Montorio (in Italian)
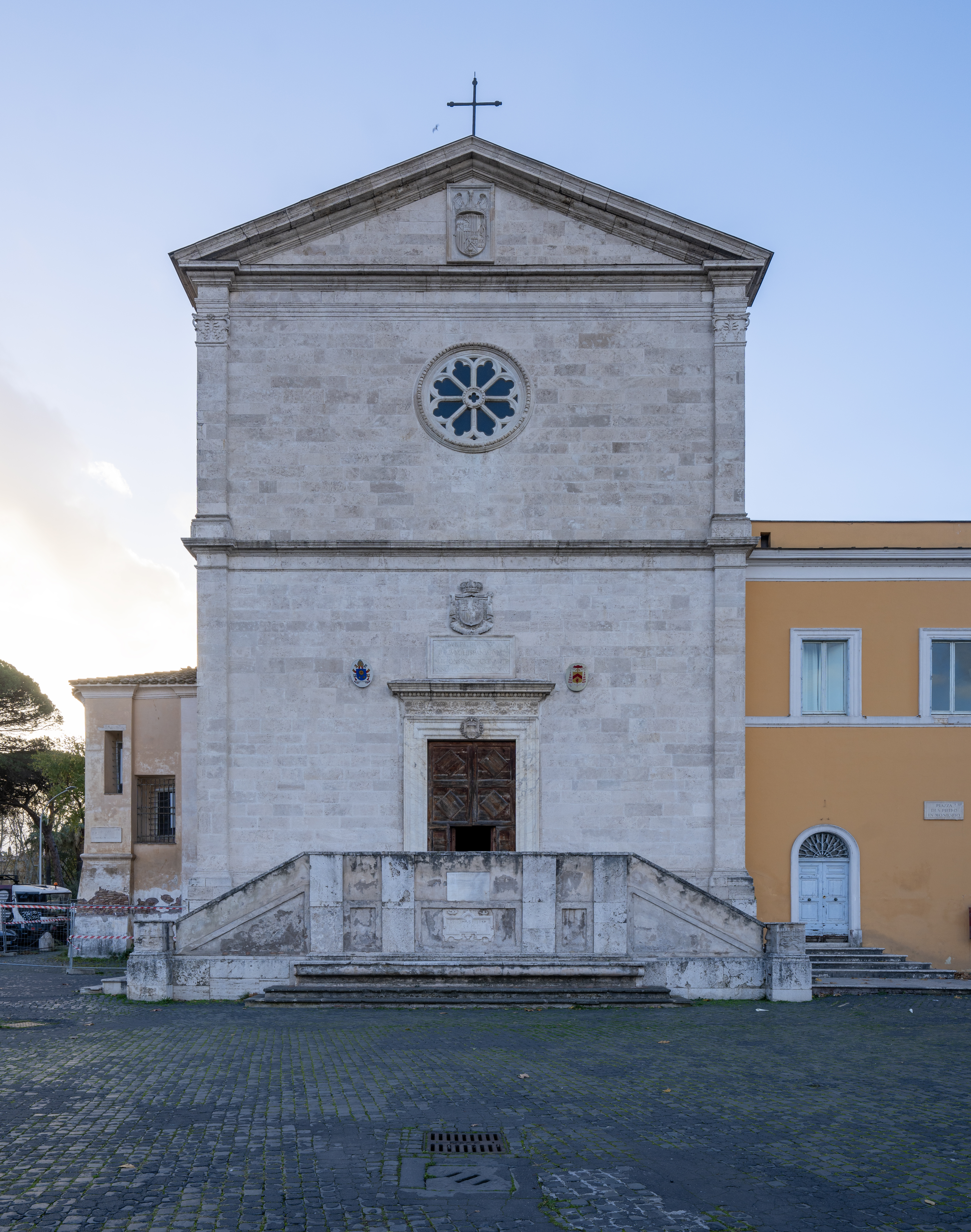
- Façade
- Click on the map for a fullscreen view
- 41°53′19″N 12°28′00″E
- Location: Piazza di S. Pietro in Montorio 2, Rome
- Country: Italy
- Denomination: Roman Catholic
- Tradition: Roman Rite
- Website: Official website, unsafe

History
- Status: Titular church, national church
- Dedication: Saint Peter
- Consecrated: 1500

Architecture
- Architect: Donato Bramante
- Architectural type: Church
- Groundbreaking: 1481

Administration
- District: Lazio

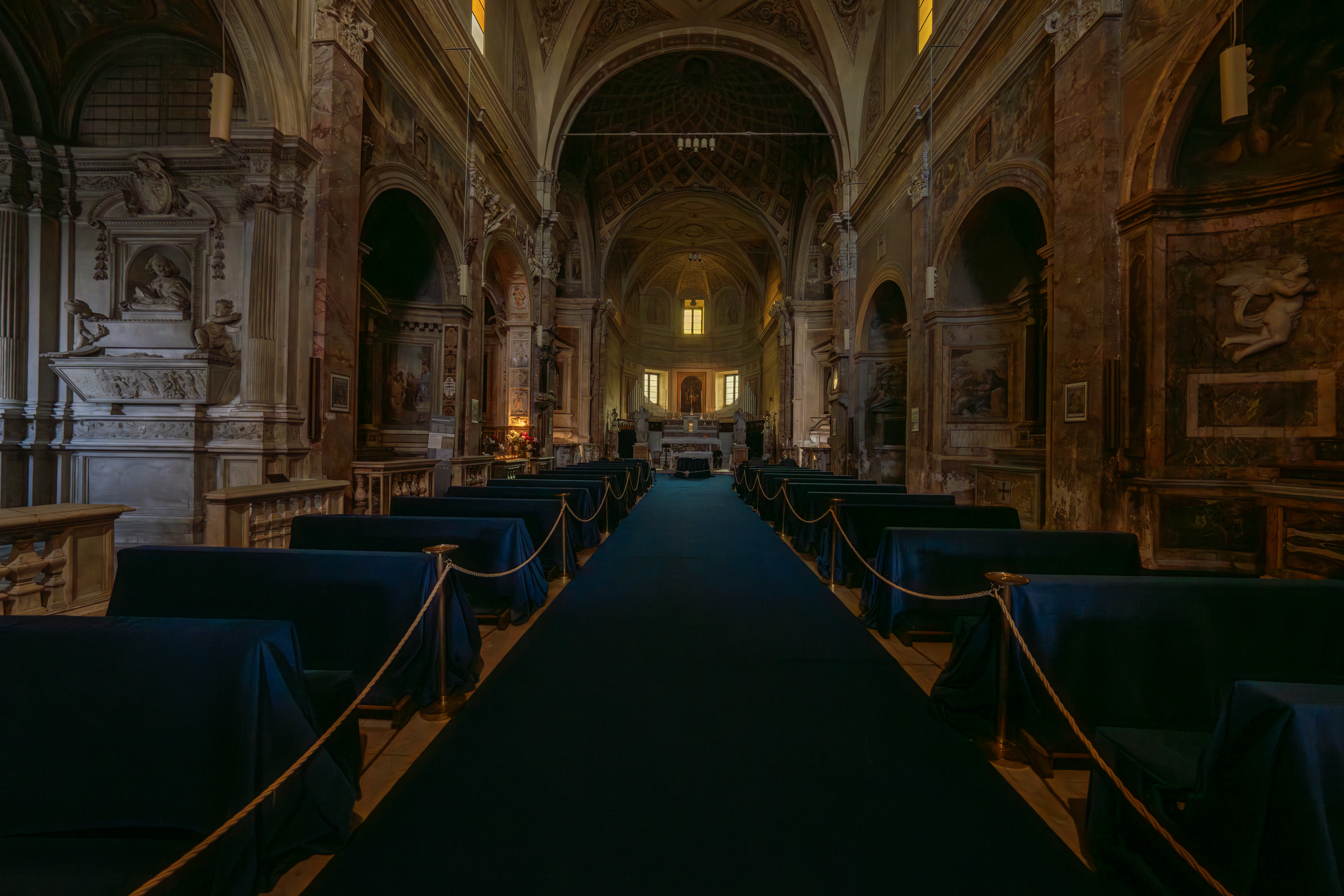
Nave

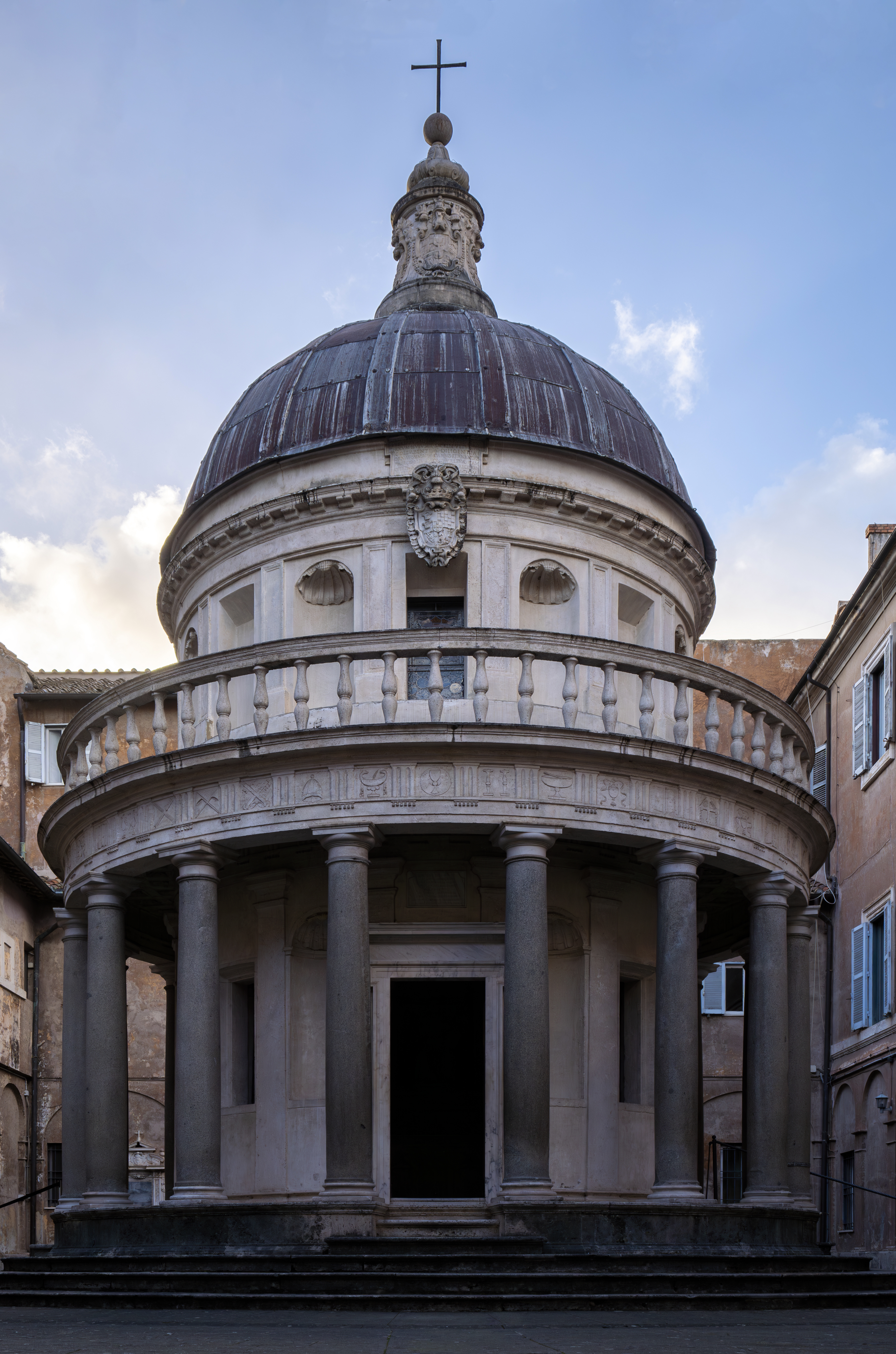
Façade of Tempietto del Bramante, with entrance to the cloister at right

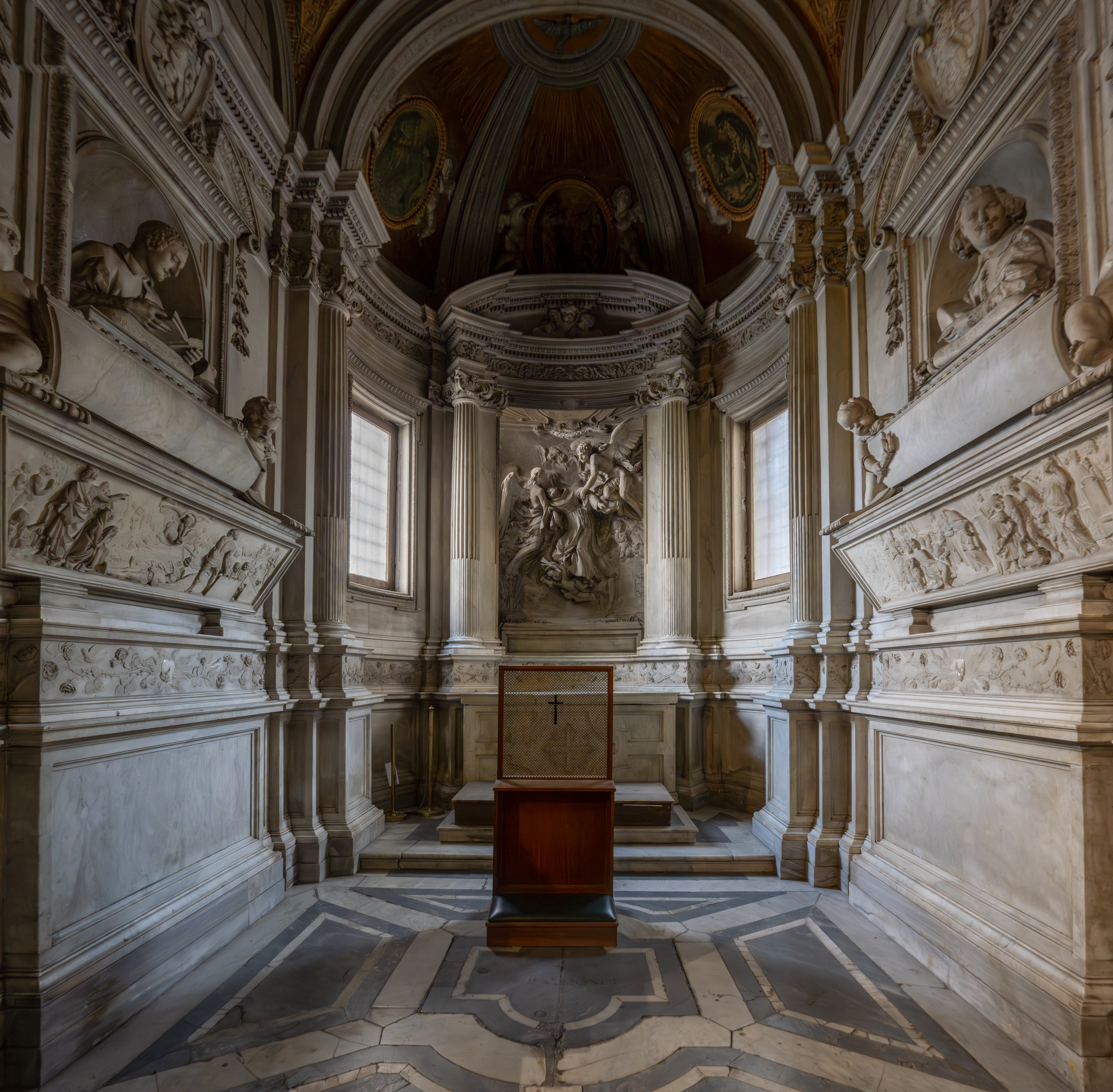
Francesco Baratta. Saint Francis in Ecstasy, c. 1640. Raimondi Chapel, San Pietro in Montorio.

San Pietro in Montorio (English: "Saint Peter on the Golden Mountain") is a church in Rome, Italy, which includes in its courtyard the Tempietto del Bramante, a small commemorative martyrium ('martyry') built by Donato Bramante.

== History ==
The Church of San Pietro in Montorio was built on the site of an earlier 9th-century church dedicated to Saint Peter on Rome's Janiculum hill. It serves as a shrine, marking the supposed site of St. Peter's crucifixion.

In the 15th century, the ruins were given to the Amadist friars, a reform branch of the Franciscans, founded by the Blessed Amadeus of Portugal, who served as confessor to Pope Sixtus IV from 1472. The church was rebuilt through the generous funding of Ferdinand and Isabella of Spain. It was consecrated in 1500 by Pope Alexander VI.

It is a titular church, whose current title holder, since 1 March 2008, is James Francis Cardinal Stafford.

== Interior ==
The church is decorated with artworks by prominent 16th- and 17th-century masters.

Until 1797, Raphael's final masterpiece, the Transfiguration, graced the high altar. At the start of the Napoleonic period, the altarpiece was expropriated by treaty by the French. it is now in the Vatican pinacoteca. The altar currently displays a copy by Cammuccini of Guido Reni's Crucifixion of St. Peter (also now in Vatican Museums). Although there is no grave marker, tradition has it that Beatrice Cenci—executed in 1599 for the murder of her abusive father and made famous by Percy Bysshe Shelley, among others—is buried below the high altar.

The first chapel on the right contains Sebastiano del Piombo's Flagellation and Transfiguration (1516–24). Michelangelo, who had befriended Sebastiano in Rome, supplied figure drawings that were incorporated into the Flagellation.

The second chapel has a fresco by Niccolò Circignani (1554), some Renaissance frescoes from the school of Pinturicchio, and an allegorical sibyl and virtue attributed to Baldassare Peruzzi.

The fourth chapel has a ceiling fresco by Giorgio Vasari.

The ceiling of the fifth chapel contains another fresco, the Conversion of St. Paul, by Vasari. The altarpiece is attributed to Giulio Mazzoni, while the funerary monument of Pope Julius III and Roberto Nobili are by Bartolomeo Ammannati. Also buried in the chapel is Julius III's scandalous 'nephew', Cardinal Innocenzo Ciocchi Del Monte.

The last chapel on the left contains a Baptism of Christ, attributed to Daniele da Volterra, and stucco-work and ceiling frescoes by Giulio Mazzoni.

A pupil of Antoniazzo Romano frescoed the third chapel with the Saint Anne, Virgin, and Child.

Dirck van Baburen, a central figure of the Dutch Caravaggisti, painted the Entombment for the Pietà Chapel, which is indebted to Caravaggio's example. Baburen worked with another Dutch artist, David de Haen in this chapel. The two other paintings, The Mocking of Christ and The Agony in the Garden are variously attributed to either or both of the artists.

The second chapel on the left, the Raimondi Chapel (1640), was designed by Gian Lorenzo Bernini. It includes Francesco Baratta's Saint Francis in Ecstasy and sculptures by Andrea Bolgi and Niccolò Sale.

== Tombs of Irish noblemen ==
At the high altar are the tombs of four Irish noblemen: Hugh O'Neill, Earl of Tyrone, his son Hugh O'Neill, 4th Baron Dungannon, and a tomb shared by Rory O'Donnell, 1st Earl of Tyrconnell, and his brother Cathbharr, both of them younger brothers of Red Hugh O'Donnell. At least eleven Irish exiles were interred at San Pietro in Montorio (including Tyrone's foster-brother Henry Hovenden), though not all have commemorative slabs.

In September 1607, following increased hostility from the English-led government, these Irish noblemen fled to Catholic Europe, accompanied with ninety followers, in what is known as the Flight of the Earls. Tyrconnell and Cathbharr died in 1608; Dungannon died in 1609. They all died of fever, probably malaria, which was caught during an ill-fated holiday to Ostia in July 1608. Their tombs are covered with marble inscribed slabs with coloured borders, crests and shields. The tombs are about 12 feet from the altar on the left-hand side and are normally covered by a carpet.

The Earl of Tyrone died in 1616 and was buried in the church with much less solemnity, likely as he left very little funds. The original simple tombstone was lost in 1849 during the Unification of Italy, but the inscription's text was copied: "D.O.M. Hugonis principis ONelli ossa" (Dedicated to God the Best and Greatest. The bones of Prince Hugh O'Neill). In 1989, Cardinal Tomás Ó Fiaich laid a new marble plaque with the same inscription in approximately the original place.

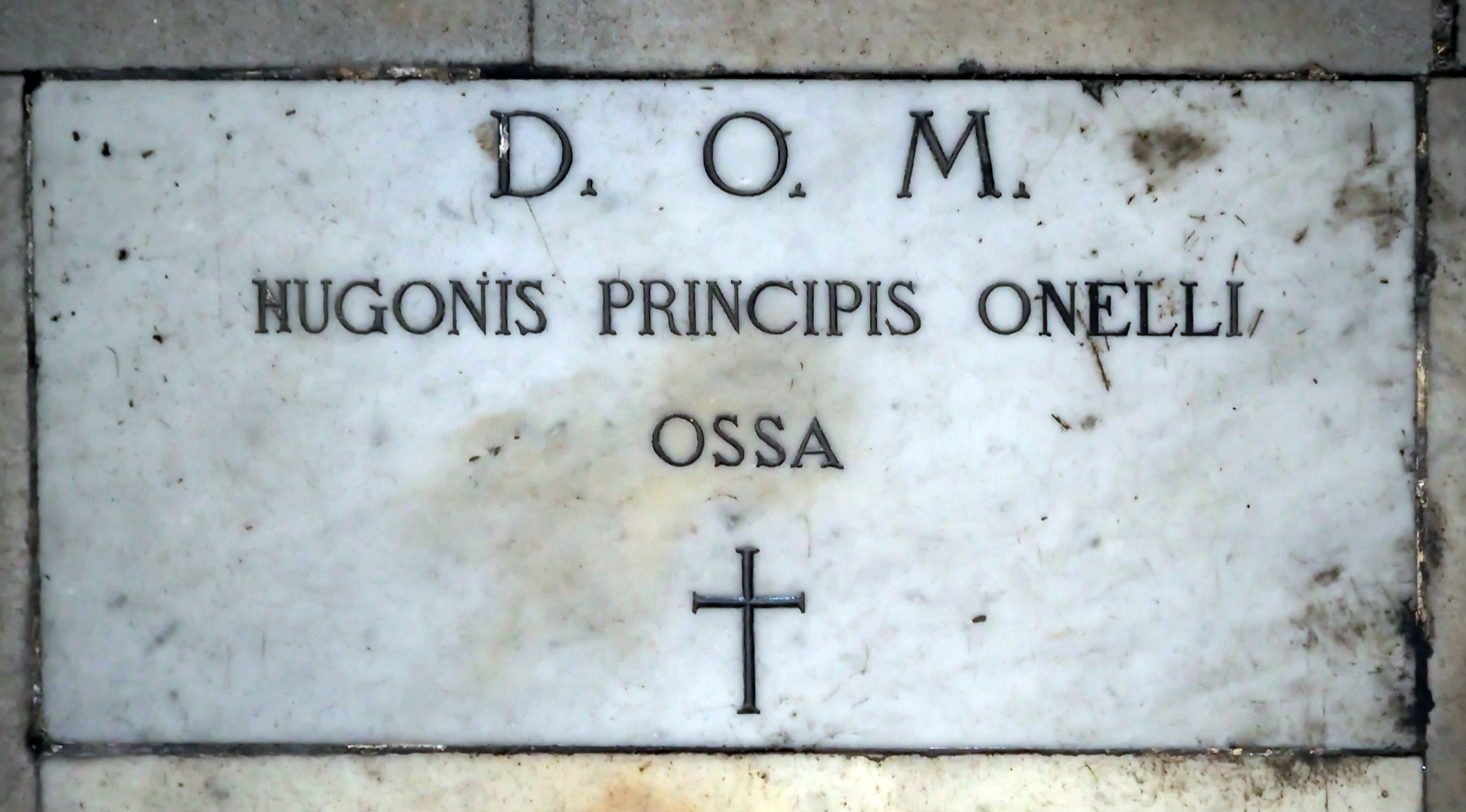
Inscription on the Earl of Tyrone's tomb

== The Tempietto ==
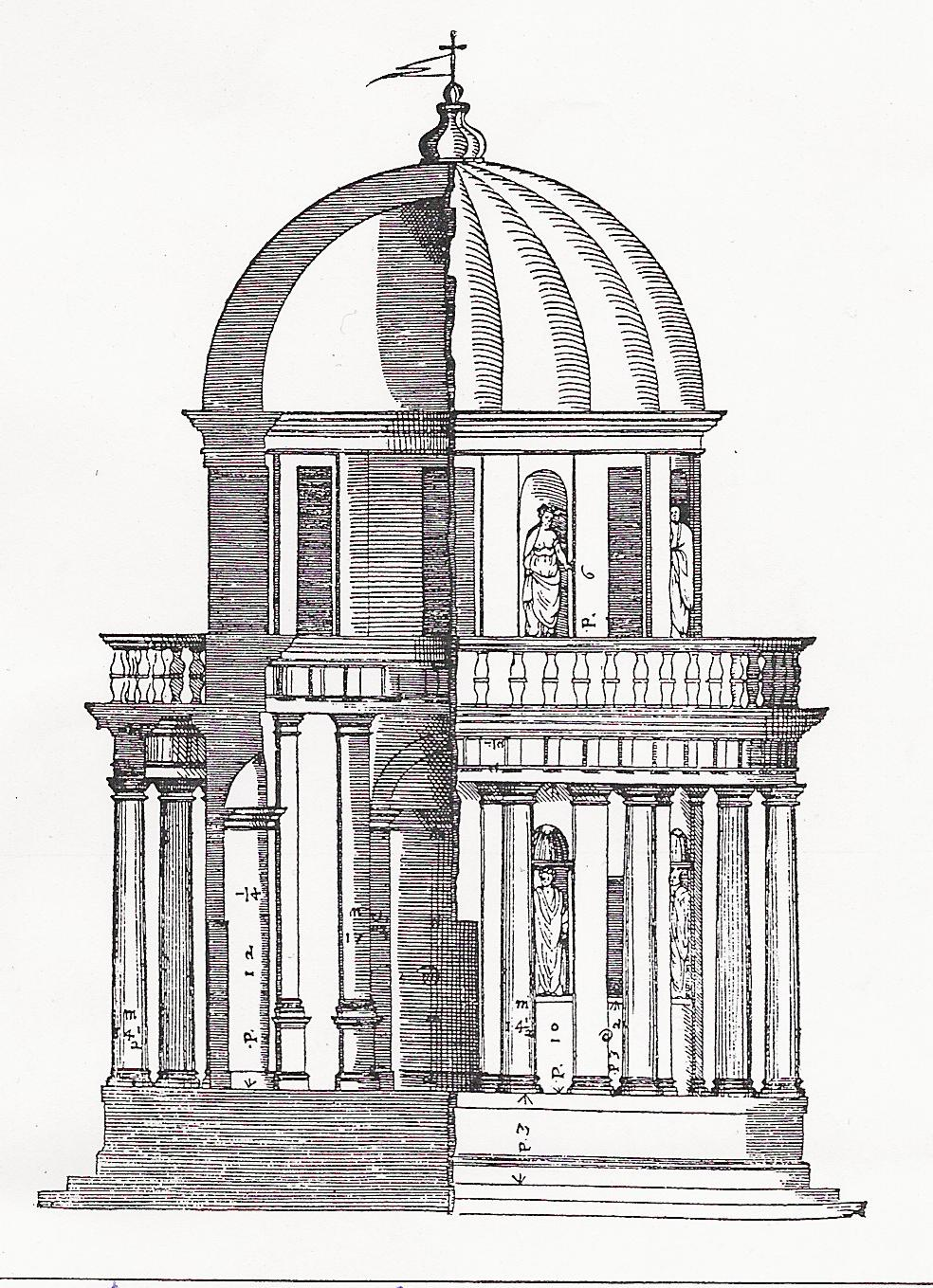
The Tempietto in Andrea Palladio's Quattro Libri (woodcut, 1570)

The so-called Tempietto (lit. 'small temple') is a small commemorative tomb (martyrium) designed by Donato Bramante, possibly built as early as 1502 in the courtyard of San Pietro in Montorio. Commissioned by Ferdinand and Isabella of Spain, the Tempietto is considered a masterpiece of High Renaissance Italian architecture. It is intended to mark the exact spot of St Peter's crucifixion.

== List of Cardinal-Priests ==
- Costanzo de Sarnano, O.F.M.Conv. (April 20, 1587 - December 20, 1595 deceased)
- Guido Pepoli (January 8, 1596 - June 1599 deceased)
- Domenico Toschi (March 17, 1599 - July 25, 1604 appointed cardinal presbyter of Sant'Onofrio)
- Anselmo Marzato, O.F.M.Cap. (June 24, 1604 - August 17, 1607 died)
- Maffeo Barberini (November 12, 1607 - May 5, 1610 appointed Cardinal Priest of Sant'Onofrio, then elected Pope Urban VIII)
- Domenico Toschi (May 5, 1610 - March 26, 1620 died)
- Cesare Gherardi (March 3, 1621 - September 30, 1623 died)
- Giovanni Doria (October 2, 1623 - November 19, 1642 died)
- Gil de Albornoz y Espinosa (August 2, 1643 - December 19, 1649 died)
- Camillo Astalli-Pamphili (October 17, 1650 - December 21, 1663 died)
- Celio Piccolomini (February 11, 1664 - May 24, 1681 deceased)
- Marco Galli (November 17, 1681 - July 24, 1683 deceased)
- Vacant title (1683 - 1686)
- Leandro Colloredo, C.O. (September 30, 1686 - November 7, 1689 appointed Cardinal Priest of Saints Nereus and Achilleus)
- Johannes von Goes (November 14, 1689 - October 19, 1696 died)
- Domenico Maria Corsi (December 3, 1696 - November 6, 1697 died)
- Baldassarre Cenci (December 2, 1697 - May 26, 1709 died)
- Antonio Francesco Sanvitale (September 9, 1709 - December 17, 1714 died)
- Bernardino Scotti (February 5, 1716 - November 16, 1726 died)
- Marco Antonio Ansidei (May 10, 1728 - July 6, 1729 appointed Cardinal Priest of Sant'Agostino)
- Francesco Scipione Maria Borghese (August 3, 1729 - March 31, 1732 appointed Cardinal Priest of San Silvestro in Capite)
- Vincenzo Bichi (March 31, 1732 - December 16, 1737 appointed Cardinal Priest of San Lorenzo in Panisperna)
- Vacant Title (1737 - 1740)
- Joseph Dominicus von Lamberg (September 16, 1740 - August 30, 1761 died)
- Vacant Title (1761 - 1782)
- Leopold Ernest von Firmian (April 19, 1782 - March 13, 1783 died)
- Vacant Title (1783 - 1819)
- Rudolph Johann of Habsburg-Lorraine (June 4, 1819 - July 24, 1831 died)
- Vacant Title (1831 - 1839)
- Antonio Tosti (February 21, 1839 - March 20, 1866 deceased)
- Paul Cullen (June 25, 1866 - October 24, 1878 deceased)
- Francisco de Paula Benavides y Navarrete (February 28, 1879 - March 30, 1895 deceased)
- Blessed Ciriaco María Sancha y Hervás (December 2, 1895 - February 25, 1909 deceased)
- Vacant title (1909 - 1912)
- Enrique Almaraz y Santos (December 2, 1912 - January 22, 1922 deceased)
- Enrique Reig y Casanova (May 25, 1923 - August 20, 1927 deceased)
- Felix-Raymond-Marie Rouleau, O.P. (December 22, 1927 - May 31, 1931 deceased)
- Vacant Title (1931 - 1935)
- Isidro Gomá y Tomás (December 19, 1935 - August 22, 1940 deceased)
- Vacant Title (1940 - 1946)
- Enrique Pla y Deniel (February 18, 1946 - July 5, 1968 deceased)
- Arturo Tabera Araoz, C.M.F. (April 30, 1969 - June 13, 1975 deceased)
- Aloísio Leo Arlindo Lorscheider, O.F.M. (May 24, 1976 - December 23, 2007 deceased)
- James Francis Stafford, since March 1, 2008

== See also ==
- 16th-century Western domes

== Sources ==
- Freiberg, Jack (2014), "Bramante's Tempietto, the Roman Renaissance, and the Spanish Crown", New York, Cambridge University Press, 2014.
- Fortunato, Giuseppe (2010), "The Role of Architectural Representation in the Analysis of the Building: The 3d Survey of San Pietro in Montorio's Temple in Rome", atti del "X Congreso Internacional expresiòn gràphica aplicada a la edificacìon, Alicante, Editorial Marfil", S.A. ISBN 978-84-268-1528-6.
- Satellite Photo. The Tempietto is the circular dome in the center, enclosed tightly by the cloister of San Pietro in Montorio. Just west is the white hemicircle of the Acqua Paola.
