= Martyrium of Saint Denis, Montmartre =

Coordinates: 48.8867°N 2.3419°E

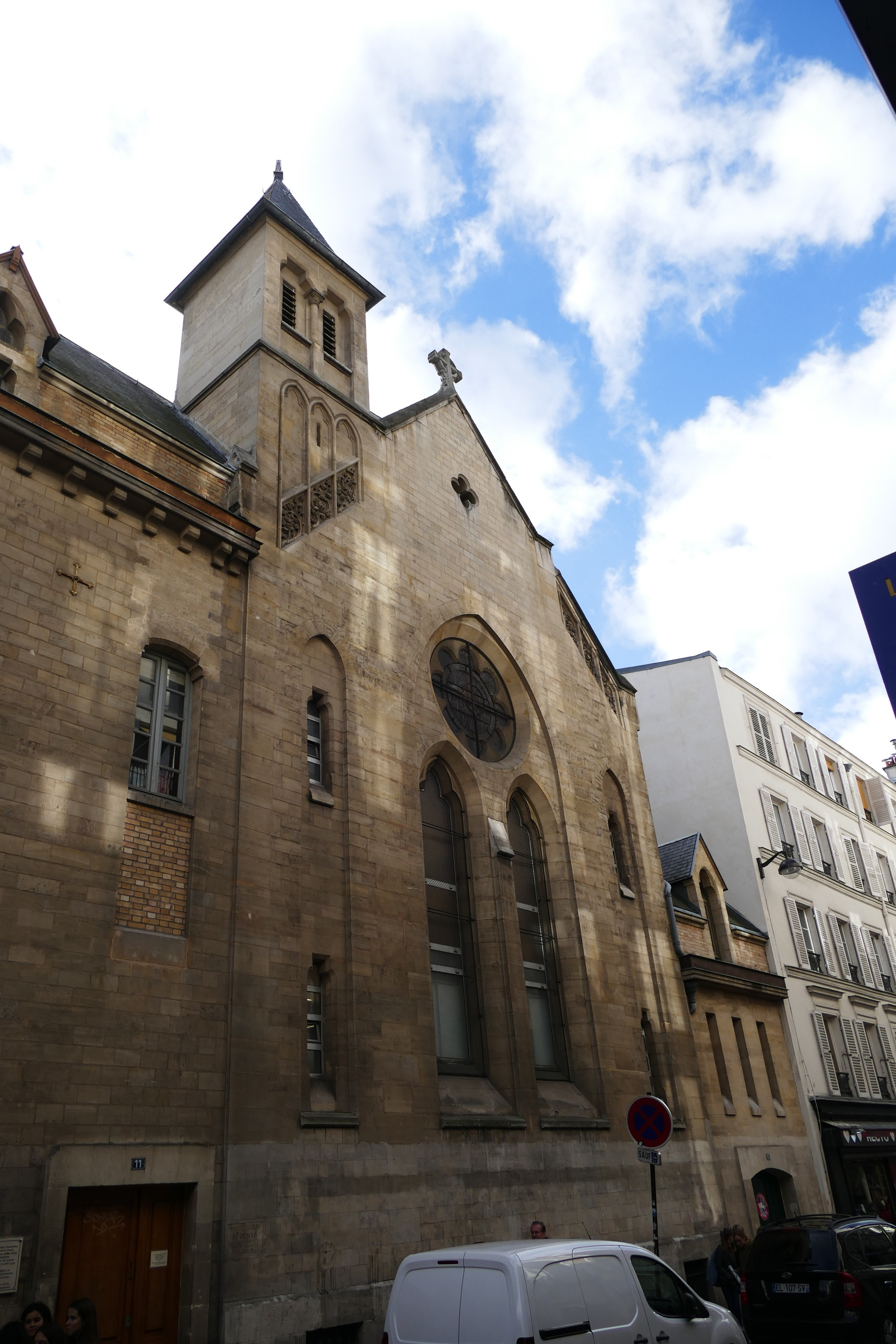
Chapel of Saint Denis, 11 Rue Yvonne le Tac, Montmartre

The hill of Montmartre became a place of popular pilgrimage after a chapel was erected by the people of Paris, around 475, where Saint Denis, the first bishop of Paris, was martyred. In the ninth century, the chapel, which had become ruined, was rebuilt. Archaeological excavations indicate that many Christians were buried in Montmartre. Their bones were gathered in a quarry on the side of the hill: the Martyrium or champ des morts.

Construction work during the 16th century exposed a staircase leading down to a crypt with three graves marked with a cross and ancient inscriptions. This discovery led people to believe that this was the site where Saint Denis and his companions had been beheaded and buried. The abbesses of Montmartre Abbey erected the Sanctum Martyrium Chapel and new monastic buildings around the crypt.

On August 15, 1534, in the Martyrium, Ignatius of Loyola, Francis Xavier, Pierre Favre and four other companions pronounced their religious vows of poverty and chastity, and promised to make a pilgrimage to Jerusalem. This "Vow of Montmartre" (Vœu de Montmartre) was received by Pierre Favre, then the only priest of the group, when he gave them communion. It was the origin of the Society of Jesus ('Jesuits'), which was given Papal approval through the bull Regimini militantis ecclesiae in 1540.

Montmartre Abbey was split between the Upper Abbey, the original buildings on the hilltop which were abandoned in the late 17th century, and The Lower Abbey, which corresponded to the new buildings erected around the Sanctum Martyrium. During the French Revolution, Montmartre Abbey, the Sanctum Martyrium Chapel, and its crypt were destroyed.

The current crypt is located on the perimeter of the parish of Saint-Pierre de Montmartre. It was built between 1884 and 1887 in the chapel of the Society of the Helpers of the Holy Souls (Sœurs Auxiliatrices du Purgatoire), a female religious congregation taking inspiration from Ignatius, founded in the nineteenth century by the Blessed Eugénie Smet (1825-1871). They had installed their "maison généralice" in Antoinette Street (now rue Yvonne Le Tac). This was on the site of the old buildings housing the Martyrium of the chapel in what was called, up to the French Revolution, "the Lower Abbey"; it was blessed on August 15, 1887, by the Archbishop of Paris and sustains the memory of these two events (the martyrdom of Denis and the Vow of Montmartre) which are of considerable significance for the Church.

The Martyrium is cared for by l'Association de la Crypte du Martyrium de Saint Denis et du Souvenir de Saint Ignace de Loyola, who open it to the public on Friday afternoons.
