= Cascina Pozzobonelli =

Historic building in Milan, Italy

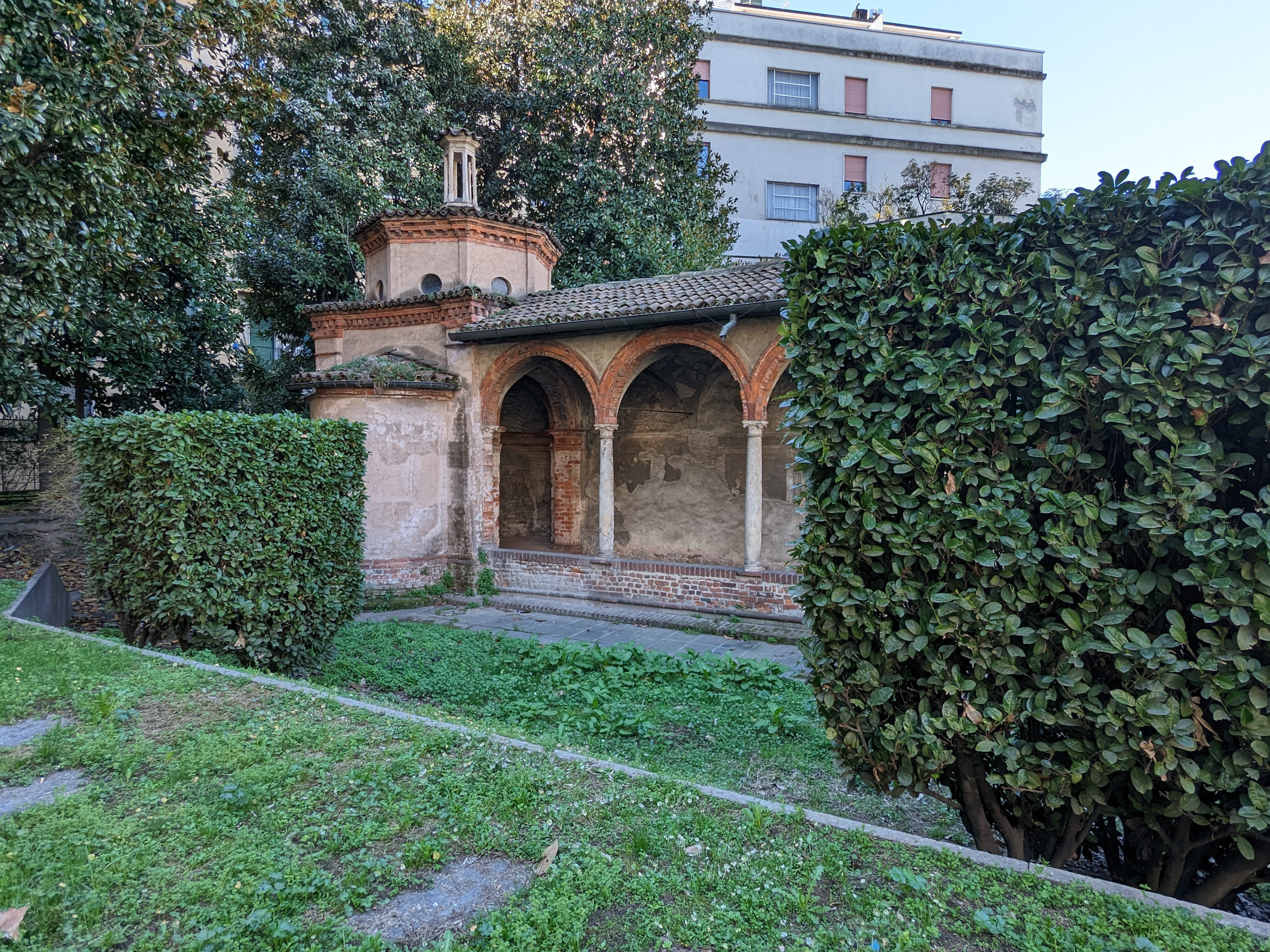
- The building in 2023

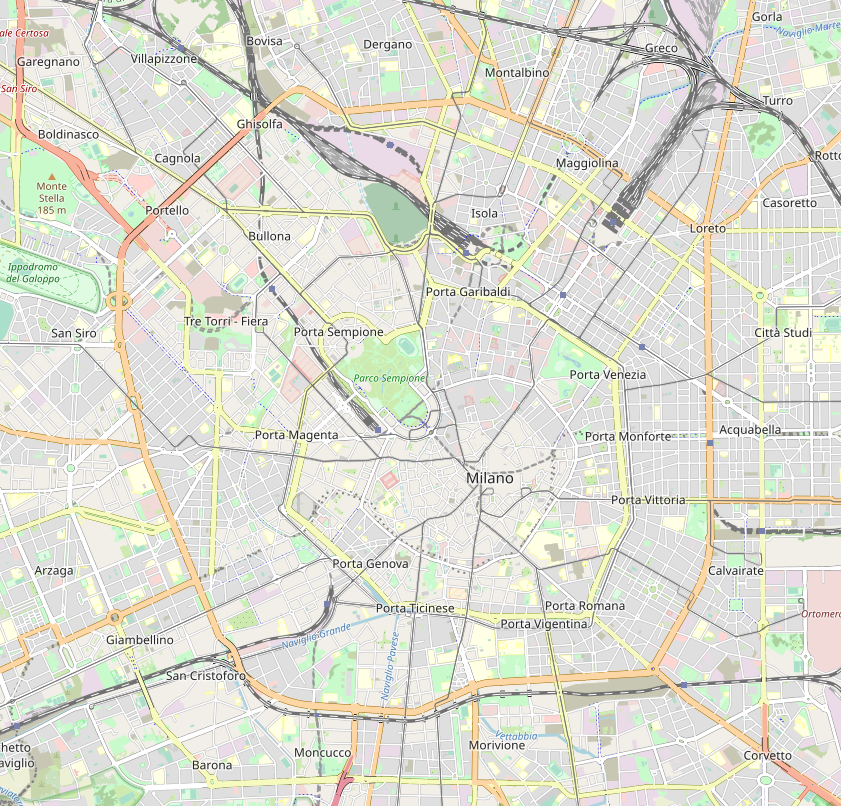
- Location within Milan Location within Milan Location within Lombardy Location within Italy
- Etymology: Pozzobonelli family

General information
- Location: Viale Andrea Doria, 4, 20124 Milano MI, Italy
- Coordinates: 45.4848°N 9.2068°E
- Completed: 1492

Design and construction
- Architect: Donato Bramante

The Cascina Pozzobonelli is a historic building in Milan, Italy, formerly used as a farmhouse. Constructed in 1492 by Donato Bramante, it is mostly in ruins with only the building's chapel remaining in a deteriorated state. The block it is on is occupied by hotels, with a courtyard specially built to accommodate the building.

== History ==
The building was constructed by Donato Bramante in 1492 under commission from Gian Giacomo Pozzobonelli, who had many of his family members involved in important affairs, being a well-known family in Milan since the 13th century. It began to fall into ruin following the death of the Archbishop of Milan, Giuseppe Pozzobonelli in 1783. Most of the rooms were demolished in 1885 when the city was being reorganized and a planned road went through the property. In 1943, during the bombings of Milan in World War II, the first span of the portico, facing towards the chapel, collapsed, although it was restored after the war was ended.

== Description ==
The Cascina Pozzobonelli is rectangular and divided into halls with large, terracotta-framed, square windows. These frames are also seen on the door preceding the portico to the chapel and the west door, which leads into a wall covered with sgraffito. The portico originally had ten arches, but only four are left. There are also two large courtyards.

The building serves an ecclesiastical purpose, being one of the convents of a congregation of Christians that became popular in the late 1400s. On the west side of the landing of the internal staircase, a capital displaying a triangle can be found, commonly associated with the Humiliati religious order. This infers that this order was the probable occupant of the building. The domed octagonal chapel, with three exterior apses, is decorated with saints and is decayed, with the door connecting it to the building having very deteriorated ornamental art. The building also sits on two half-buried crypts containing eight vaults each. These crypts were covered by wooden beams, except one with a lunette. This suggests that the building originally had a more elaborate plan, but it was never completed.

== See also ==
- Late medieval domes
