= Palazzo Visconti frescoes =

Frescoes by Donato Bramante

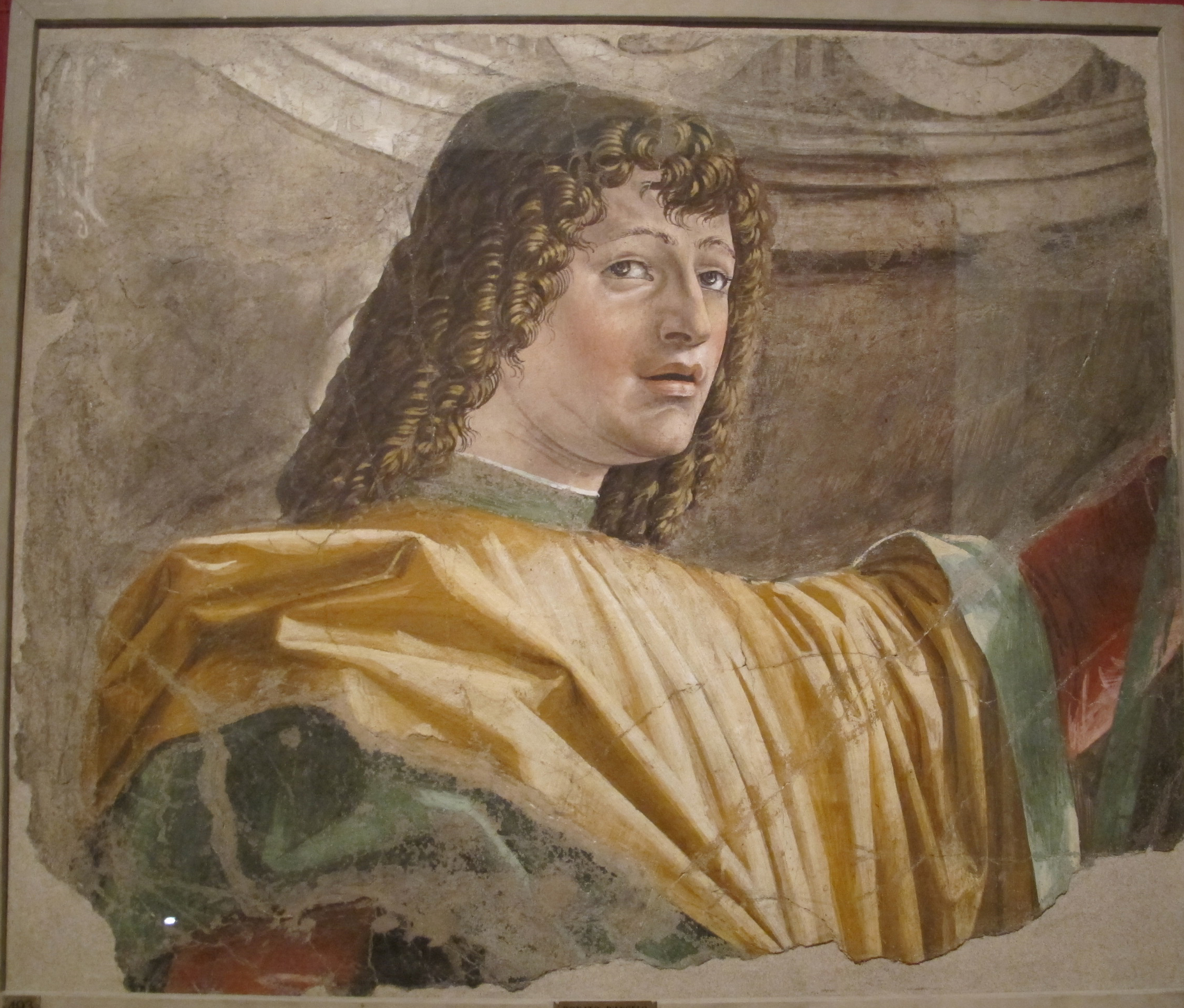
Man with a Halberd

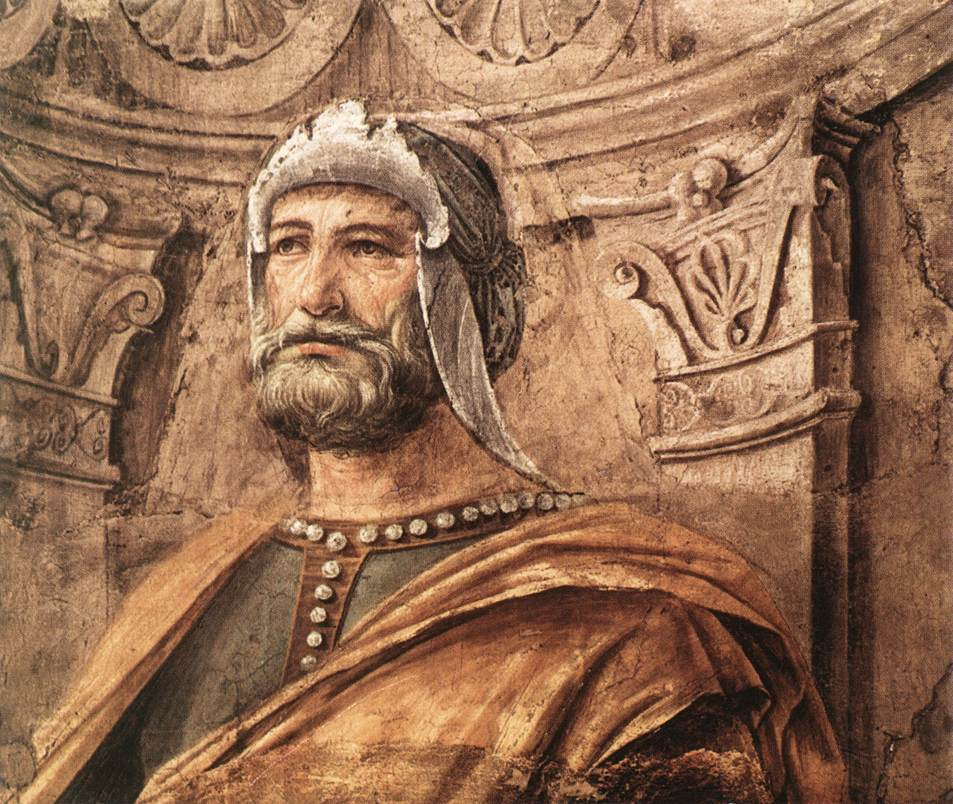
Soldier

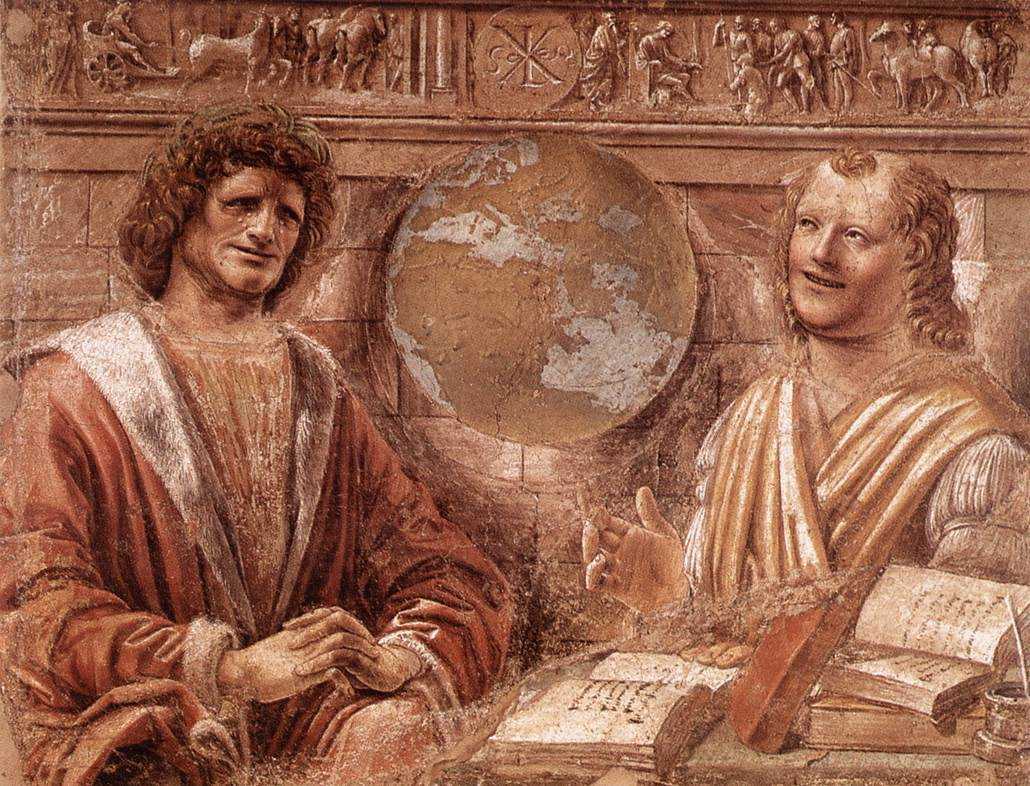
Heraclitus and Democritus

The Palazzo Visconti frescoes are a series of eight frescoes by Donato Bramante, created in 1486-1487, now hanging in the Pinacoteca di Brera, in Milan. They are the only surviving fragments of the decorative scheme in a room of the now-demolished Palazzo Visconti (later renamed the Palazzo Panigarola) on via Lanzone in Milan and were commissioned by its then-owner, privy counsellor Gaspare Ambrogio Visconti. The earliest mention of them is one in the 16th century written by Giovanni Paolo Lomazzo when the cycle in the room was still complete – he states that they showed the most famous soldiers of their time.

It consists of:

- First soldier
- Second soldier
- Third soldier
- Singer
- Man with a club
- Man with a halberd
- Heraclitus and Democritus
- Man with a broadsword

They are shown inside fake architectural niches, which help give them considerable perspectival strength. The figures' clear definition and the clear spatial network help give the figures a sculptural impression. This and their archaeologically researched costumes turn the figures into soldiers of ancient Rome.

The works belong to a Renaissance tradition of cycles of famous people, such as Andrea del Castagno's Famous Men and Women Cycle and Famous Men of the Past and Present in the studiolo of Federico da Montefeltro.

== Bibliografia ==
- (in Italian) S. Bandera (ed.), Brera. La Pinacoteca e i suoi capolavori, Skira, Milano 2009.
- (in Italian) Carlo Ludovico Ragghianti (ed.),Pinacoteca di Brera, Arnoldo Mondadori, Milano, 1970
- (in Italian) Mina Gregori (ed.), Pittura a Milano, Rinascimento e Manierismo, Cariplo, Milano 1999.
