= Christ at the Column (Bramante) =

Oil painting by Donato Bramante

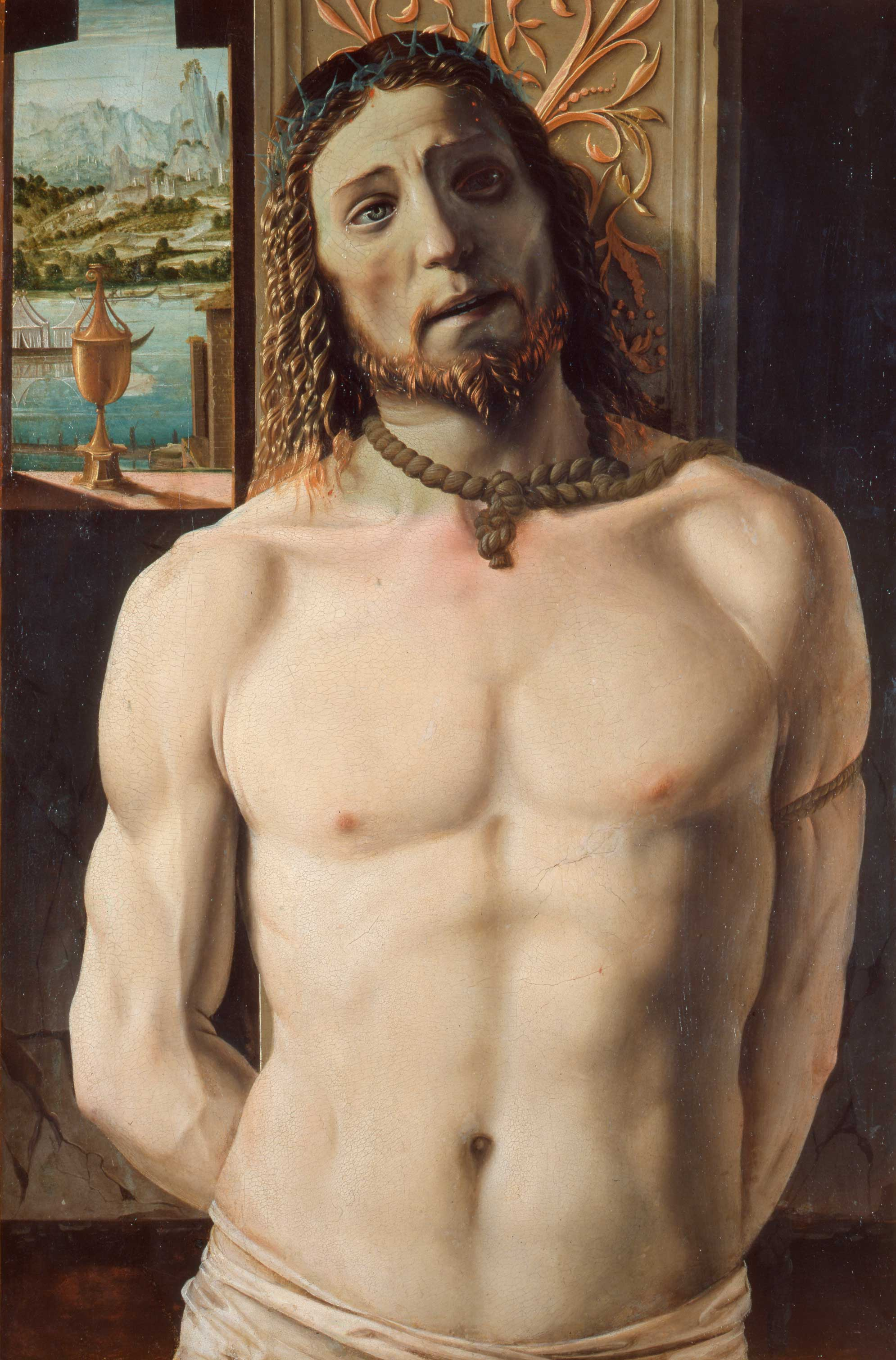
- Artist: Donato Bramante
- Year: c. 1490
- Medium: Oil on panel
- Dimensions: 93.7 cm × 62.5 cm (36.9 in × 24.6 in)
- Location: Pinacoteca di Brera, Milan

Christ at the Column is an oil on panel painting attributed to the Italian Renaissance architect and painter Donato Bramante, executed c. 1490 and held at the Pinacoteca di Brera, in Milan.

== History ==
The panel was commissioned by the Abbey of Chiaravalle near Milan. It is the only known surviving panel painting attributed to Bramante. The attribution isn't universally accepted. Some scholars, such as William Suida, consider the painting more likely the work of Bramantino.

The work has been in the museum since 1915, on deposit from the abbey, where it was replaced by a copy. On January 15, 2017, following a malfunction of the heating system, the painting, together with another forty, suffered damage due to the sudden change in temperature. It was immediately taken to the museum's laboratory for restoration.

== Description and style ==
The work depicts Christ tied to a column (in this case an ornate pillar with classical bas-relief decoration) before being scourged. The very close up shot transmits a very strong emotion, accentuating the already poignant scene and creating, on the whole, an atmosphere of strong psychological tension. Even more, the details, such as the rope dangling from the neck of Christ, contribute to create that remarkable emotional apprehension that flows from the entire composition. The procedure with which the idea of a vast colonnaded space is given is, in practice, the same used in the architecture of the fake choir of Santa Maria at San Satiro: the extension of the main elements beyond the boundaries of the painting and the suggestion of distance between foreground and background.

The classic modeling of the body of Christ attests the influence of the Urbino culture from which Bramante artistically came, while other details demonstrate the influence of the Flemish painting, such as the double lighting (frontal, in this case oriented from left to right, and from the window on the background), the view that fades into the distance, and the meticulous attention to detail. In this sense, the study on light stands out, creating a myriad of colored reflections, as in the reddish and blue ones in the hair and beard of Christ.

Some details refer to Leonardo da Vinci's influence, such as the study of the expressive potential of the face, or some details of extreme realism such as the flesh tightened by ropes or transparent tears.

A golden pyx rests on the windowsill, a reference to the Eucharist, which reveals the meaning of Christ's sacrifice.
