= Callisto Piazza =

Italian painter (1500–1561)

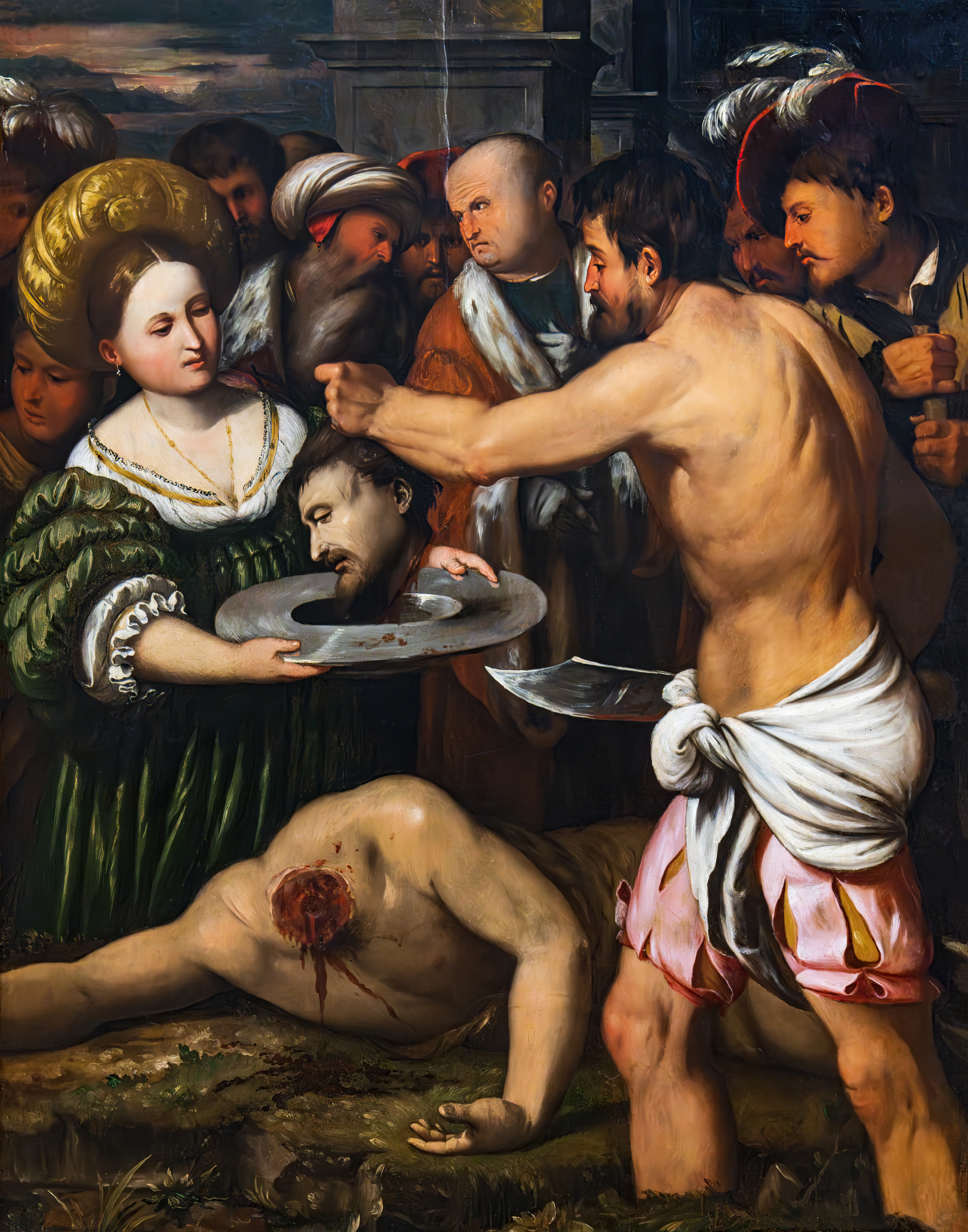
Beheading of the Baptist, Gallerie dell'Accademia in Venice

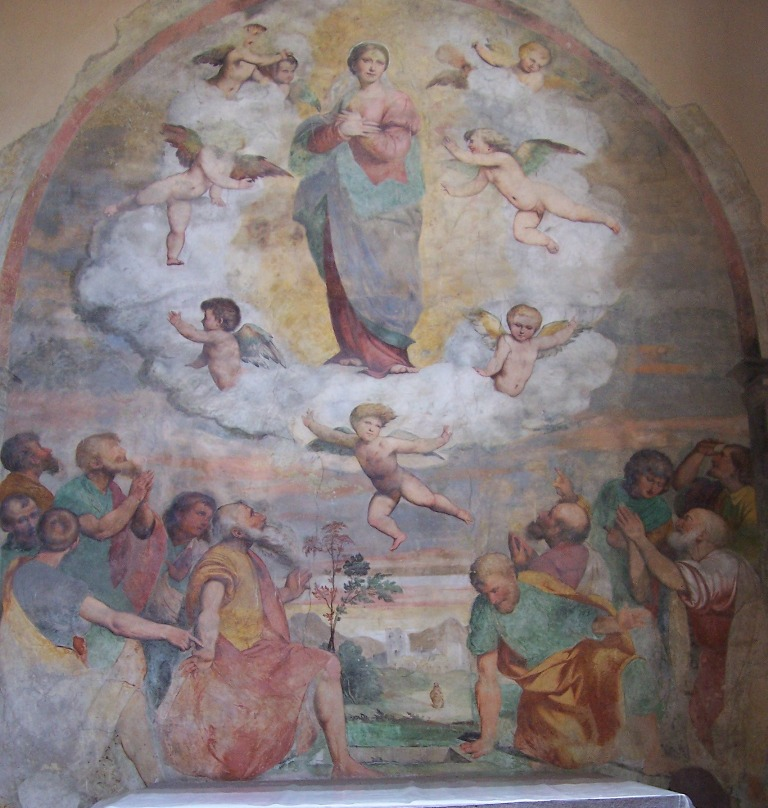
Frescoes by Piazza in the church of Santa Maria in Restello, Erbanno.

Callisto Piazza (1500–1561) was an Italian painter.

== Biography ==
Callisto, a member of the Piazza family of painters, was born in Lodi, Lombardy.

In 1523 he was working in Brescia. His first dated and signed work is from the following year, and shows a typical Brescian style. This style was then emerging, and included artists such as Romanino and Moretto. Piazza shows influences from contemporaries such as Dosso Dossi and Ludovico Mazzolino of the School of Ferrara, as well as Giovanni Agostino da Lodi.

In 1526–1529 Piazza worked in Val Camonica, at Erbanno, Borno, Breno, Esine and Cividate Camuno. In 1529 he returned to his native Lodi, where he formed a workshop with his brothers Cesare and Scipione (died 1552). In 1538, while in Crema, he married the noblewoman Francesca Confalonieri. Later Callisto moved to Milan, where he received numerous commissions, such as the decoration of the San Girolamo chapel in Santa Maria presso San Celso (1542); the decoration of the refectory of the convent of Sant'Ambrogio (1545); the frescoes for the Saletta Negra in the Castello Sforzesco; and the decoration of the Simonetta chapel in San Maurizio al Monastero Maggiore (1555), largely executed with the assistance of his son Fulvio. He also worked in Lodi at the Incoronata (1454), Novara, at the Abbey of Chiaravalle and other areas of Lombardy.

His graphic style is often confused with that of Romanino, who exerted a deep influence on his work.

Callisto returned to Lodi in 1551 and died there ten years later.
