= Donato Bramante =

Italian architect and painter (1444–1514)

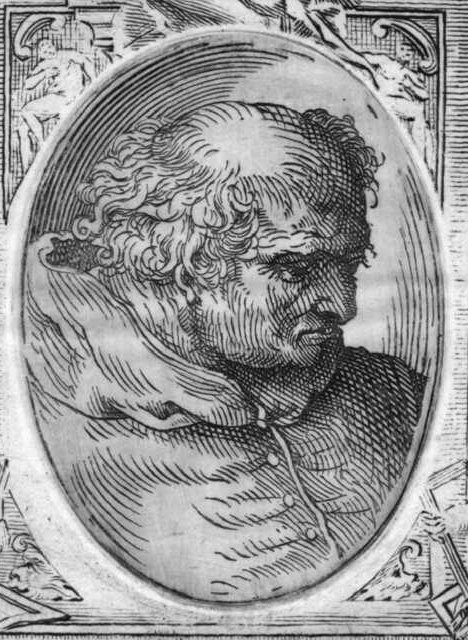
- Donato Bramante
- Born: Donato di Pascuccio d'Antonio; 1444; Fermignano, Duchy of Urbino (present-day Italy)
- Died: 11 April 1514 (aged 69–70); Rome, Papal States (present-day Italy)
- Known for: Architecture; painting
- Notable work: San Pietro in Montorio
- Movement: High Renaissance

Donato Bramante (Note: UK: /bræˈmænteɪ/ bram-AN-tay, US: /brəˈmɑːnteɪ, -ti/ brə-MAHN-tay, -tee; Italian: [doˈnaːto braˈmante].) (1444 – 11 April 1514), born as Donato di Pascuccio d'Antonio and also known as Bramante Lazzari, was an Italian architect and painter. He introduced Renaissance architecture to Milan and the High Renaissance style to Rome, where his plan for St. Peter's Basilica formed the basis of the design executed by Michelangelo. His Tempietto (San Pietro in Montorio) marked the beginning of the High Renaissance in Rome (1502) when Pope Julius II appointed him to build a sanctuary over the spot where Peter was martyred.

== Life ==
=== Urbino ===
Bramante, born Donato d'Augnolo according to the 1911 Encyclopedia Britannica, was born at Fermignano near Urbino. Here, in 1467, Luciano Laurana was adding to the Palazzo Ducale an arcaded courtyard and other Renaissance features to Federico da Montefeltro's ducal palace. Bramante's architecture has eclipsed his painting skills: he knew the painters Melozzo da Forlì and Piero della Francesca well, who were interested in the rules of perspective and illusionistic features in Andrea Mantegna's painting.

=== Milan ===
Around 1474, Bramante moved to Milan, a city with a deep Gothic architectural tradition, and built several churches in the new Antique style. The Duke, Ludovico Sforza, made him virtually his court architect, beginning in 1476, with commissions that culminated in the famous trompe-l'œil choir of the church of Santa Maria presso San Satiro (1482–1486). Space was limited, and Bramante made a theatrical apse in bas-relief, combining the painterly arts of perspective with Roman details. There is an octagonal sacristy, surmounted by a dome. In Milan, Bramante also built the tribune of Santa Maria delle Grazie (1492–99); other early works include the Cloisters of Sant'Ambrogio, Milan (1497–1498), and some other constructions in Pavia (where he worked on the Cathedral, setting the design and creating the crypt and part of the apse) and possibly Legnano. However, in 1499, with his Sforza patron driven from Milan by an invading French army, Bramante made his way to Rome, where he was already known to the powerful Cardinal Riario.

=== Rome ===
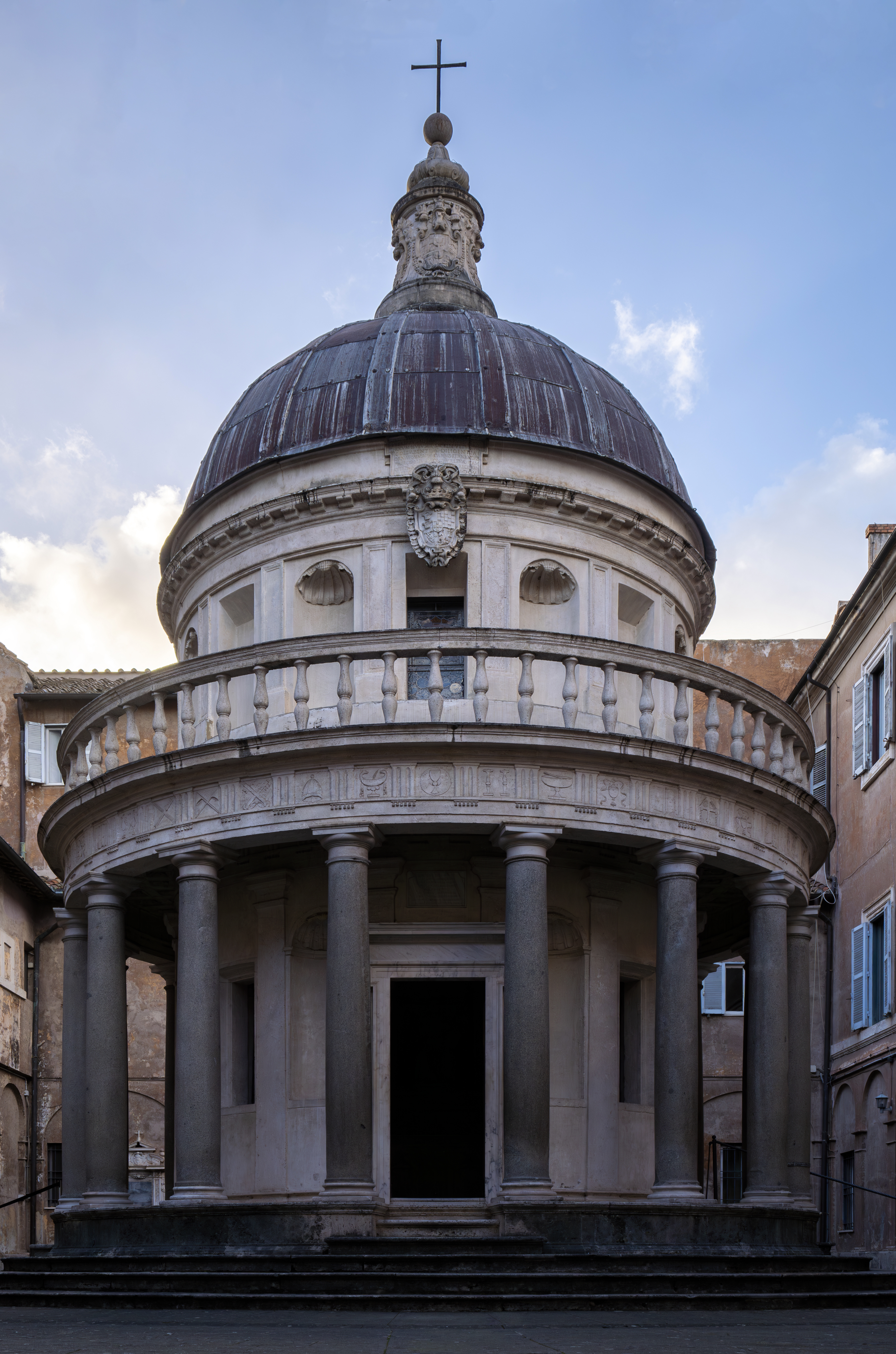
Tempietto

In Rome, he was soon recognised by Cardinal Della Rovere, shortly to become Pope Julius II. For Ferdinand of Aragon and Isabella of Castile or possibly Julius II, Bramante designed one of the most harmonious buildings of the Renaissance: the Tempietto (1502) of San Pietro in Montorio on the Janiculum. Despite its small scale, the construction has all the rigorous proportions and symmetry of Classical structures, surrounded by slender Doric columns, surmounted by a dome. According to a later engraving by Sebastiano Serlio, Bramante planned to set it within a colonnaded courtyard. In November 1503, Julius engaged Bramante for the construction of the grandest European architectural commission of the 16th century, the complete rebuilding of St Peter's Basilica. During this time, he created the plans for a vast outdoor courtyard connecting the surrounding buildings called, Cortile del Belvedere. The cornerstone of the first of the great piers of the crossing was laid with ceremony on 17 April 1506. Very few drawings by Bramante survive, though some by his assistants do, demonstrating the extent of the team which had been assembled. Bramante's vision for St Peter's, a centralized Greek cross plan that symbolized sublime perfection for him and his generation (compare Santa Maria della Consolazione at Todi, influenced by Bramante's work) was fundamentally altered by the extension of the nave after his death in 1514. Bramante's plan envisaged four great chapels filling the corner spaces between the equal transepts, each one capped with a smaller dome surrounding the great dome over the crossing. So Bramante's original plan was very much more Romano-Byzantine in its forms than the basilica that was actually built. (See St Peter's Basilica for further details.)

Bramante also worked on several other commissions. Among his earliest works in Rome, before the Basilica's construction was underway, is the cloister (1500–1504) of Santa Maria della Pace near Piazza Navona.

Plans for St Peter's Basilica

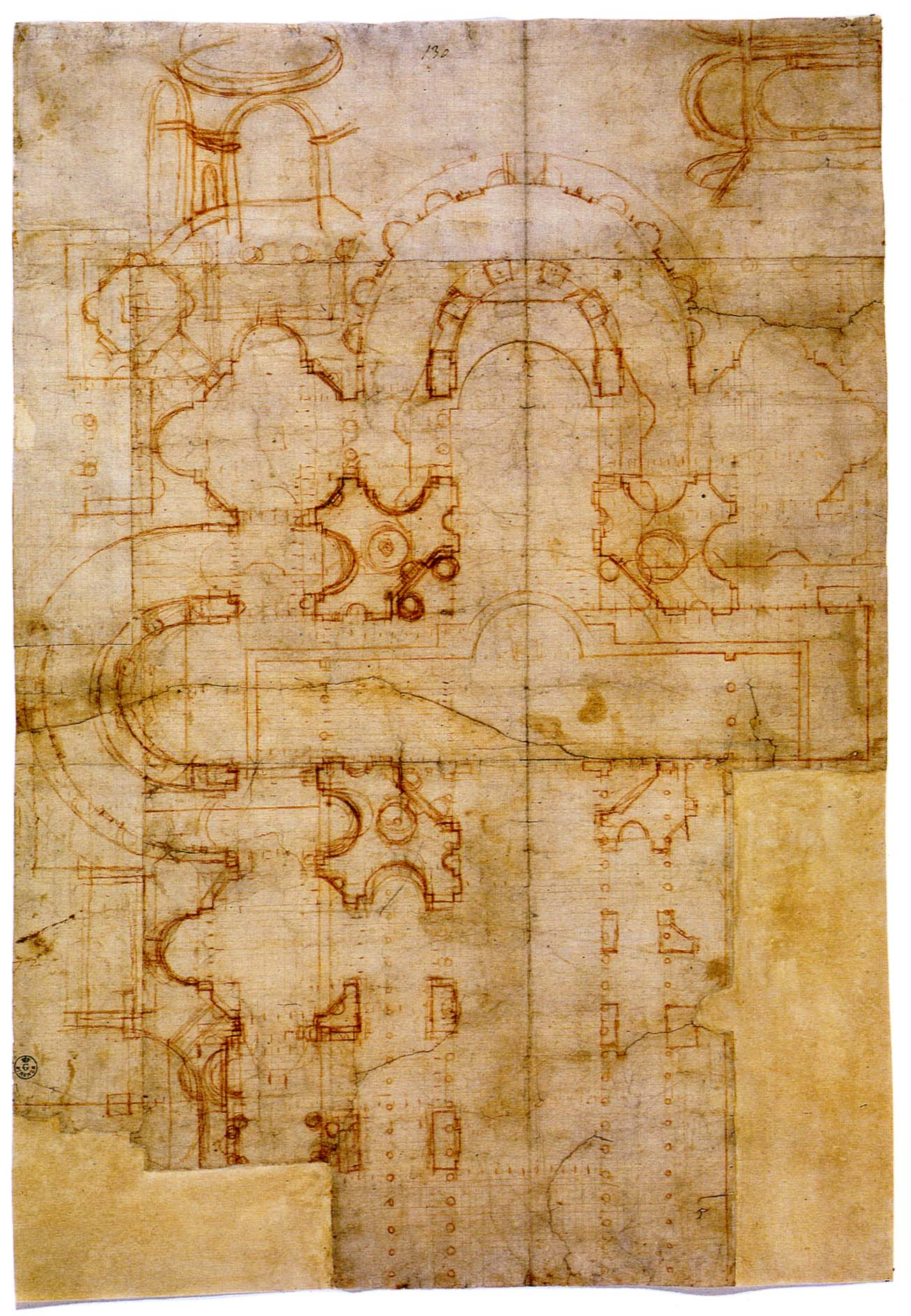
A draft for St Peter's superimposed over a plan of the ancient basilica

Bramante's presentation plan, as a Greek cross design; as reconstructed by Geymüller

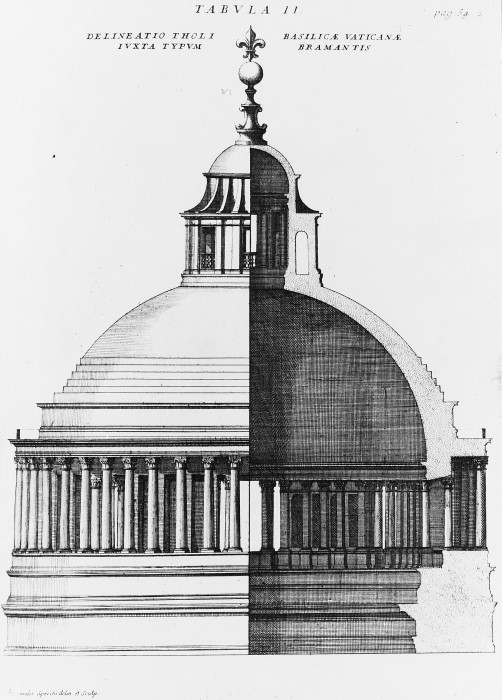
The dome, as planned by Bramante

== Works ==
- Casa Fontana-Silvestri; Milan, ca. 1480
- Santa Maria presso San Satiro; Milan, ca. 1482–1486
- Palazzo Visconti frescoes; Pinacoteca Di Brera, Milan, 1486-1487
- Pavia Cathedral (project for the dome and crypt); Pavia, ca. 1488-1492
- Palazzo della Cancelleria; Rome, ca. 1489-1513
- Christ at the Column (Bramante); Pinacoteca Di Brera, Milan, ca. 1490
- Basilica of Sant'Ambrogio (project for refectory); Milan, ca. 1492
- Cascina Pozzobonelli; Milan, 1492
- Castello Sforzesco (tower); Vigevano, 1492-1494
- Santa Maria delle Grazie (cloister and apse); Milan, 1492–1498
- Castello Sforzesco (project for loggia bridge and frescoes); Milan, ca. 1494
- Cloisters of Sant'Ambrogio; design 1497, two built in 1505 and 1620-1630 respectively
- Chiostro del Bramante; Santa Maria della Pace, Rome, ca. 1500-1504
- Milan Cathedral (central cupola); Milan, design 1488, built 1500-1510
- The Tempietto, San Pietro in Montorio; Rome, 1502
- Basilica of San Magno; Legnano, 1504-1513
- Cortile del Belvedere (plan); Rome, 1505
- The Bramante Staircase; Vatican Museums, Vatican City, 1505
- St. Peter's Basilica; Rome, design 1503, ground breaking 1506
- Cortile del Belvedere; Vatican City, Rome, 1506
- Forte Michelangelo; Port of Civitavecchia, Civitavecchia, 1508-1535
- San Giovanni in Oleo; ca. 1509
- Palazzo Caprini (also known as Raphael's House); Rome, started around 1510 (demolished in the 17th century)
- Basilica della Santa Casa (facade, design of marble screen, 12 inner chapels); Loreto
- Vatican loggias; Apostolic Palace, Vatican City

In addition to building, Bramante wrote about architecture and composed eighty sonnets.

== See also ==
- Leon Battista Alberti
- Giorgio Vasari
- Renaissance in Urbino
- The Agony and the Ecstasy

== Footnotes ==
=== References ===
11.^ Guagliumi Silvia. (2014) Donato Bramante. Pittore e sommo architetto in Lombardia e a Roma. L'uomo, le idee e l'opera.

Silvia Editrice ISBN 978-88-96036-63-1.
