= Milan =

Second-largest city in Italy

Milan Milano (Italian)
- Comune
- Comune di Milano
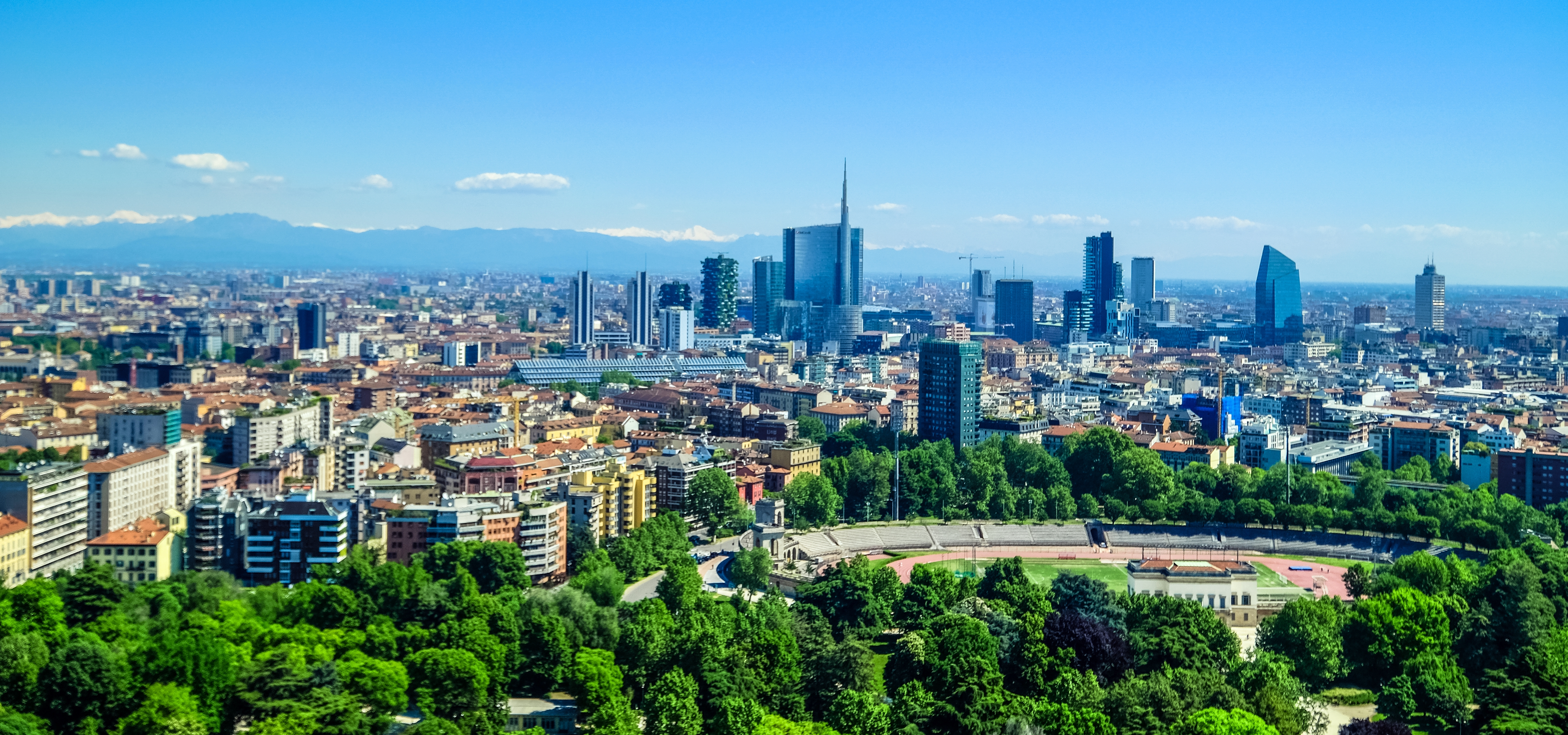
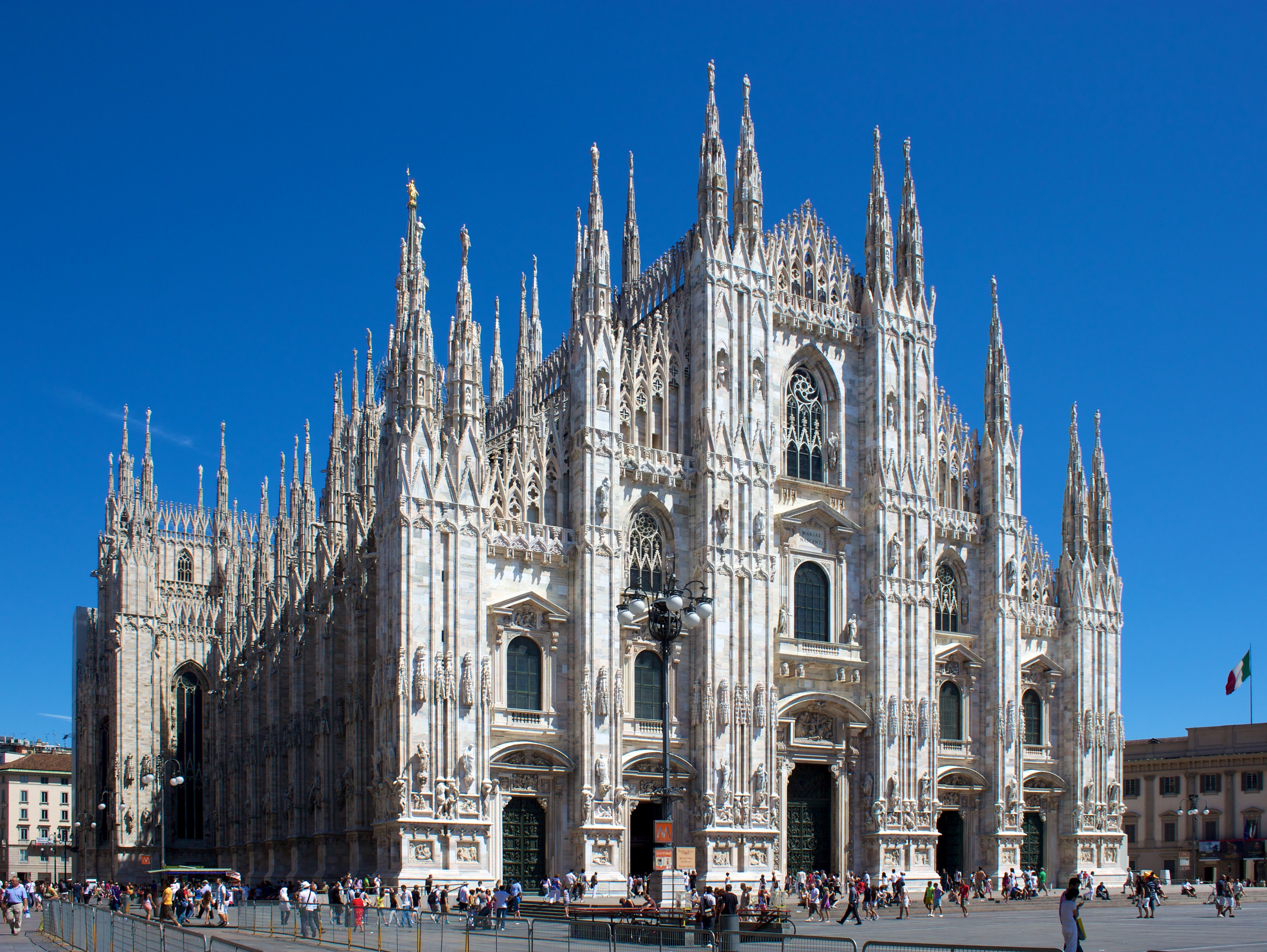
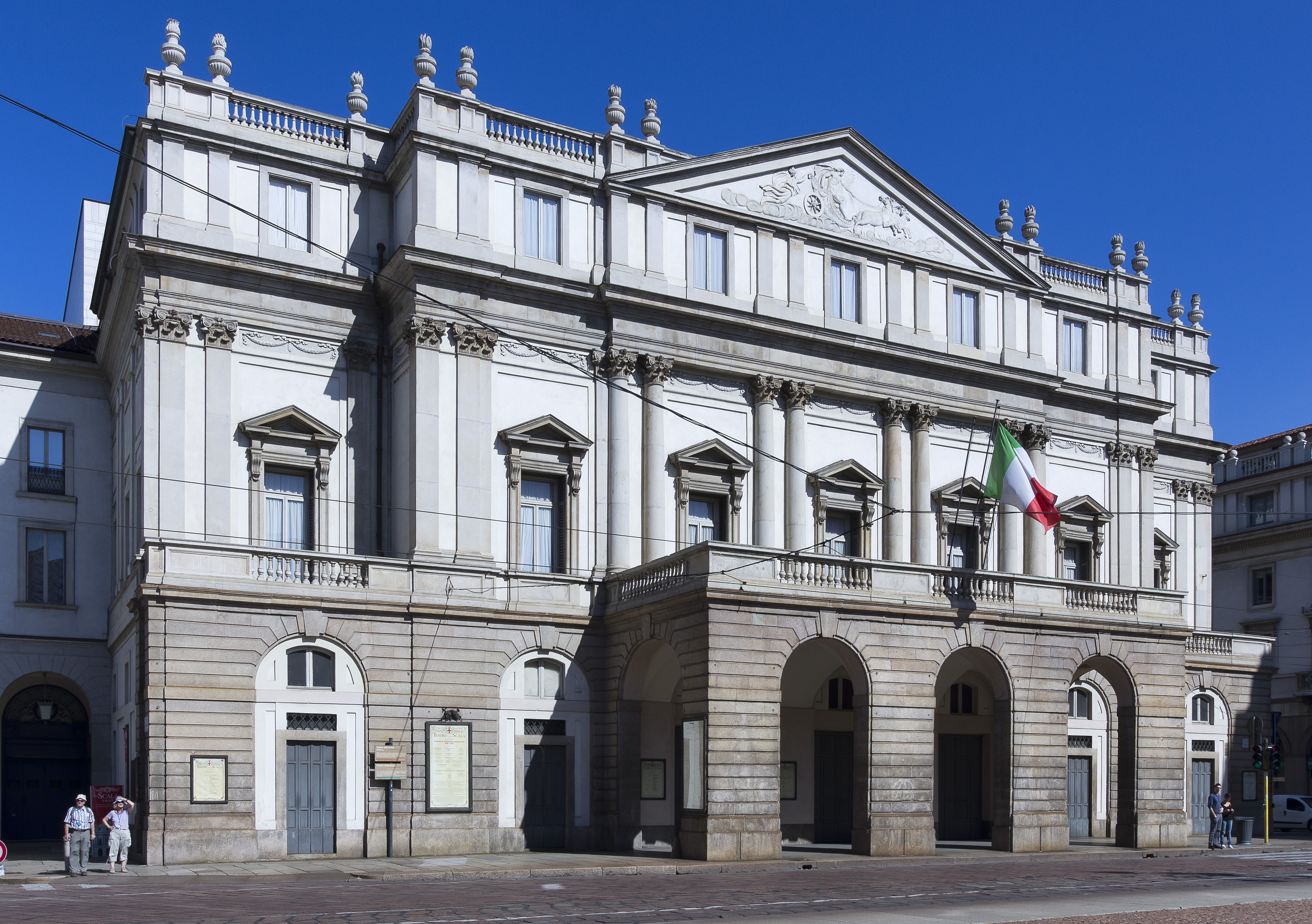
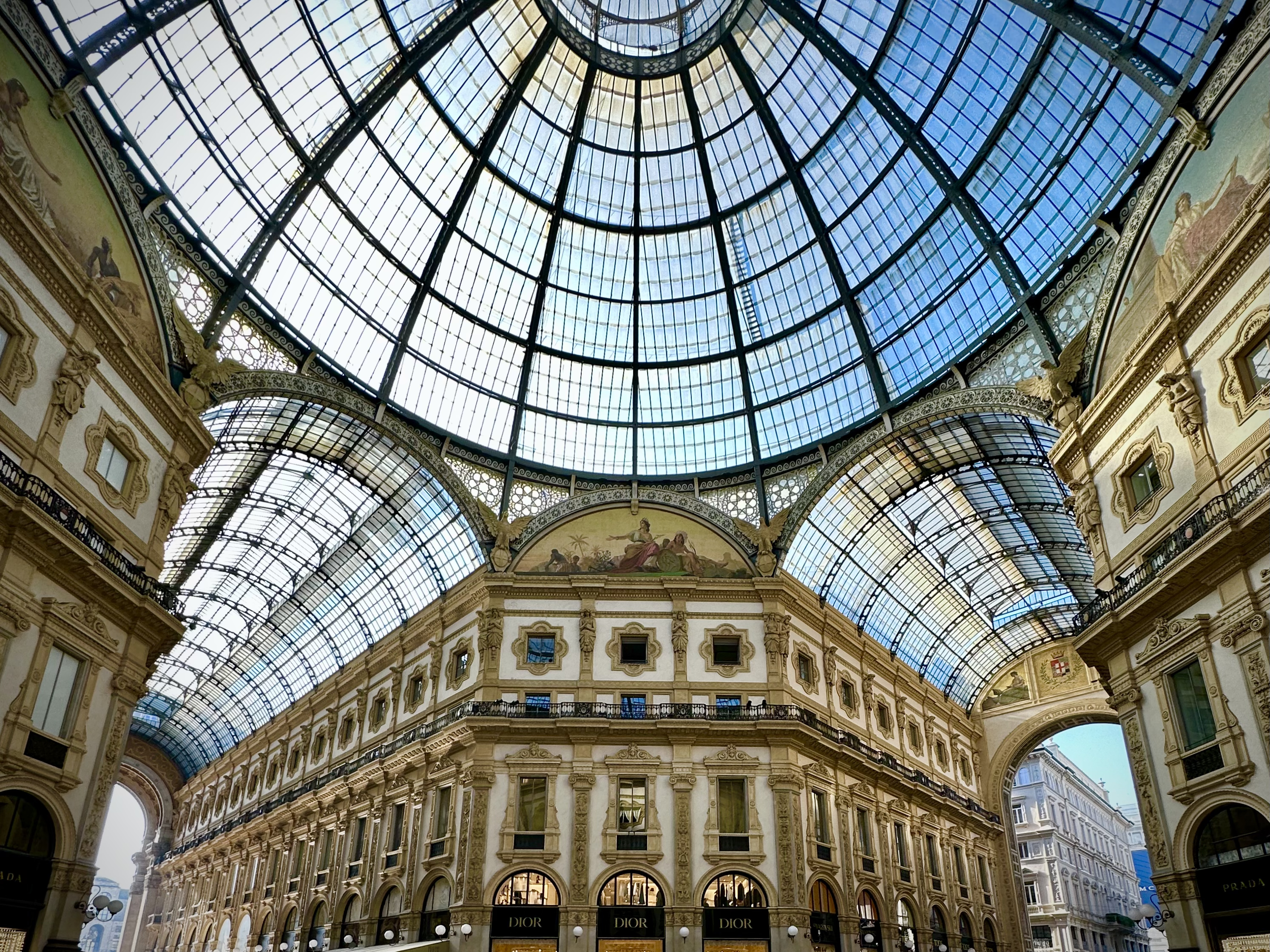
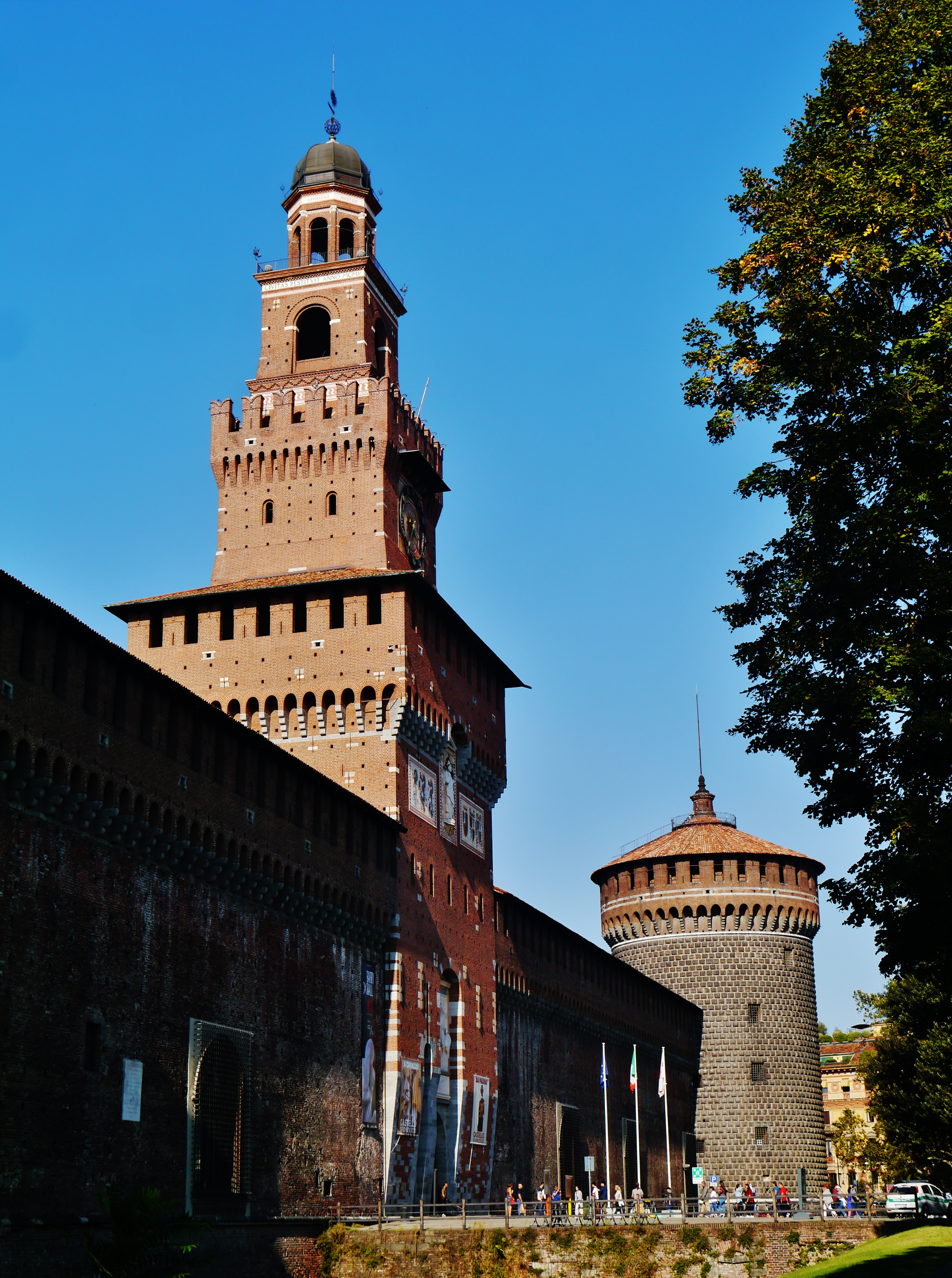
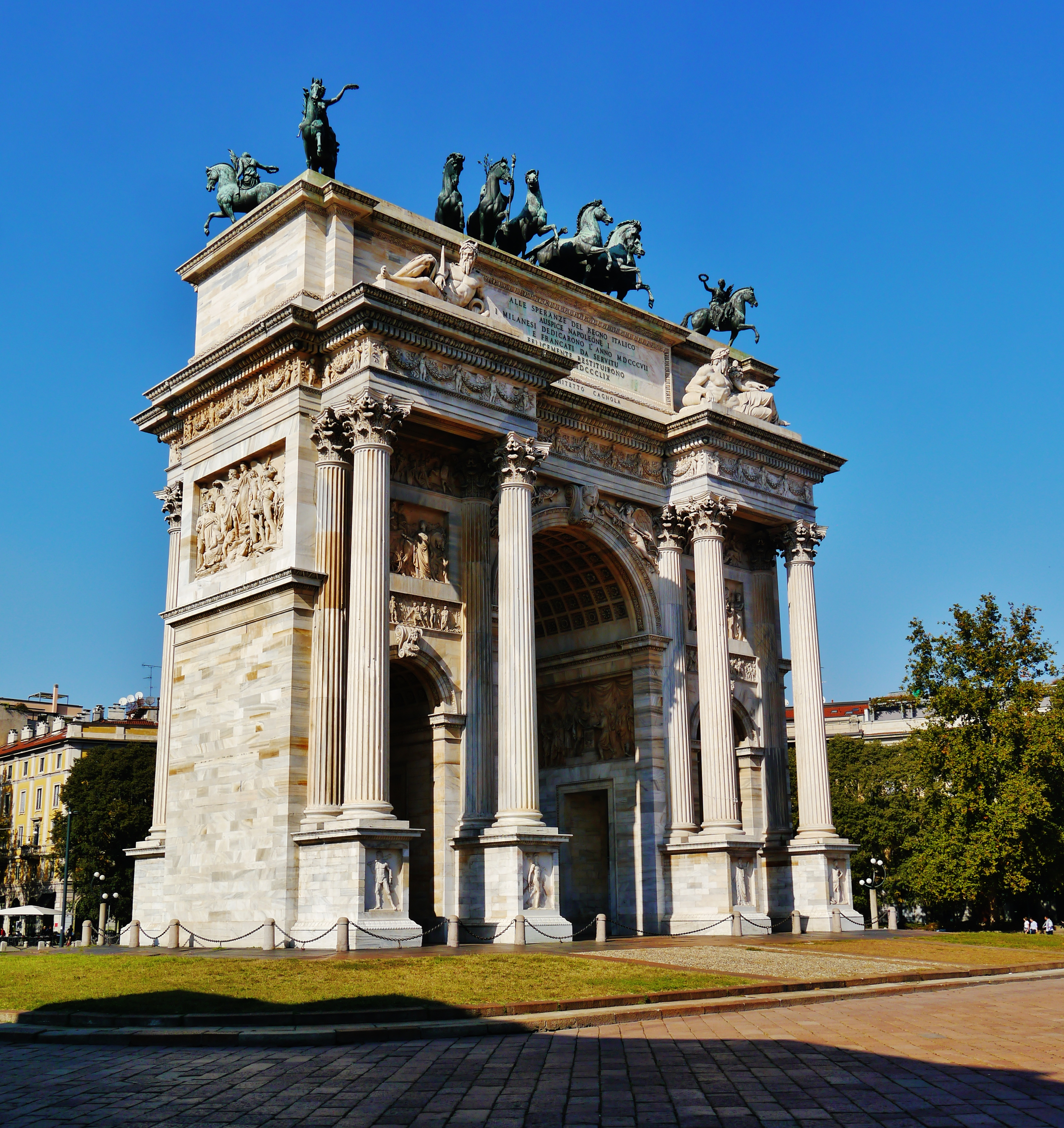
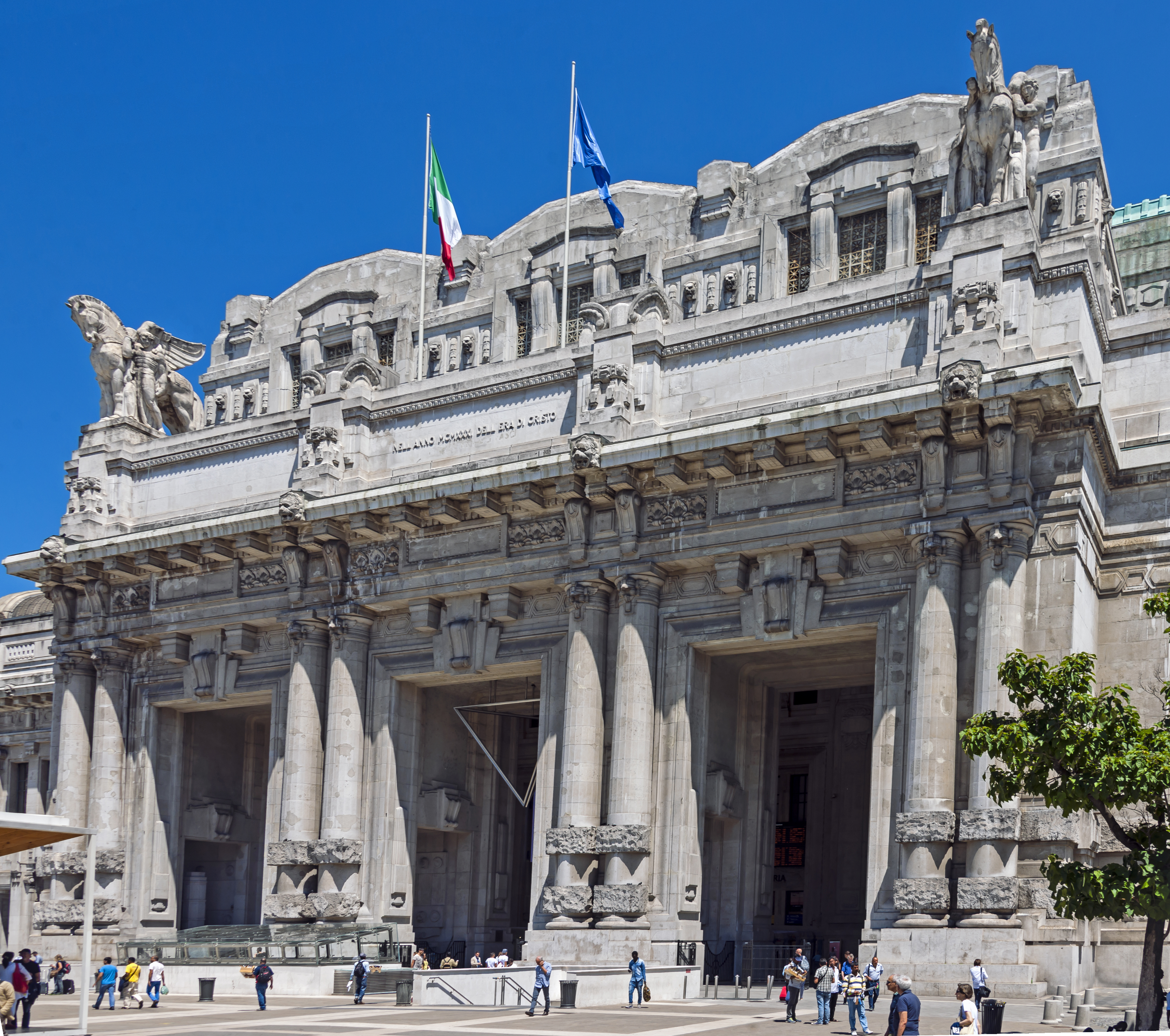
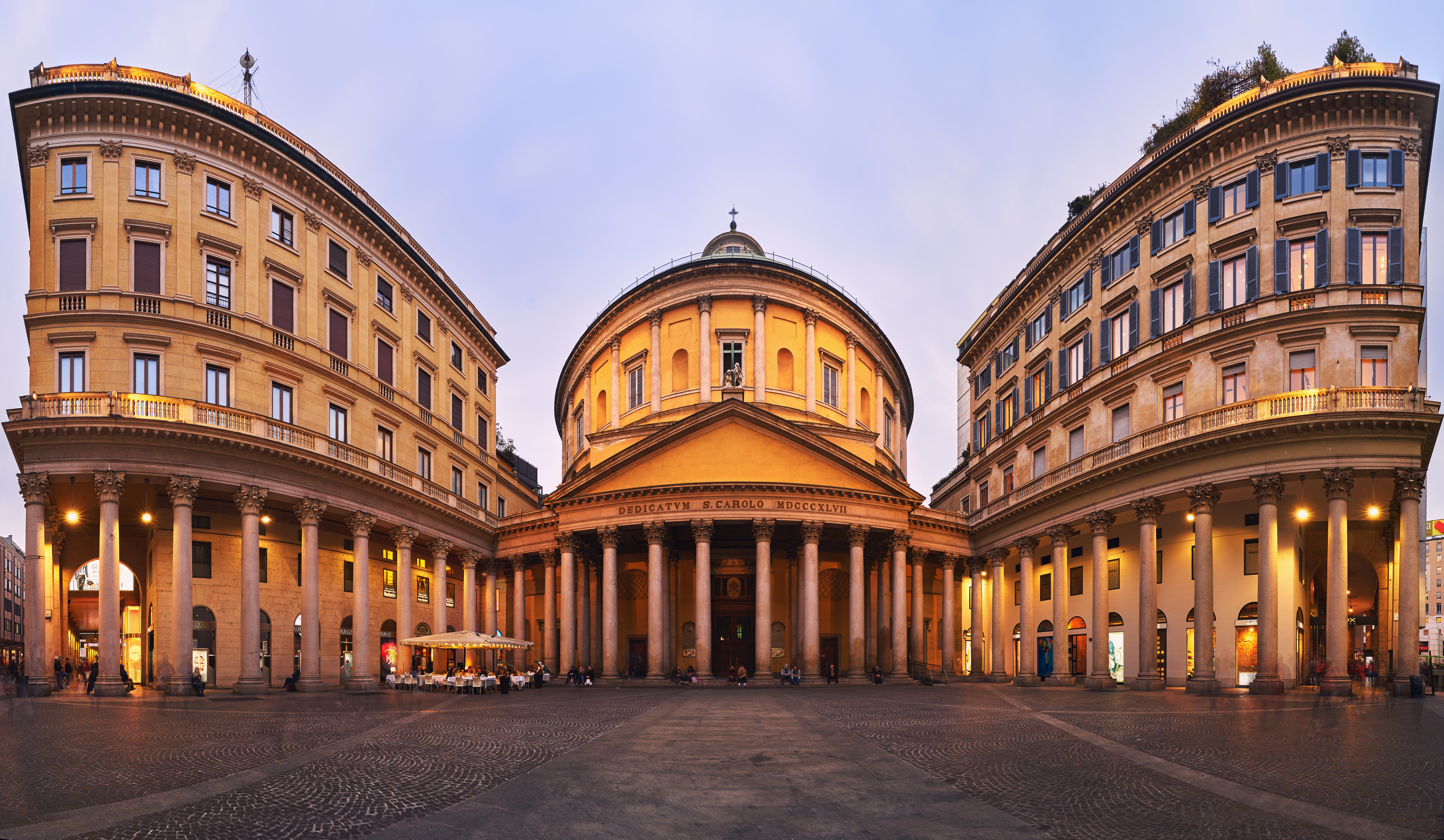
- Skyline of Milan with the Porta Nuova business district Milan Cathedral La Scala Galleria Vittorio Emanuele II Sforza Castle Porta Sempione Milano Centrale San Carlo al Corso

- Flag Coat of arms
- Interactive map of Milan
- Location within Italy Location within Lombardy Location within Europe
- Coordinates: 45°28′01″N 09°11′24″E
- Country: Italy
- Region: Lombardy
- Metropolitan city: Milan

Government
  - Type: Strong Mayor–Council
  - Mayor: Giuseppe Sala
  - Legislature: Milan City Council

Area
  - Comune: 181.67 km^{2} (70.14 sq mi)
  - Metro: 3,632 km^{2} (1,402 sq mi)
- Elevation: 120 m (390 ft)

Population (2026)
  - Comune: 1,362,863
  - Rank: 2nd in Italy
  - Density: 7,501.9/km^{2} (19,430/sq mi)
  - Metro: 6,550,000
- Demonym(s): Milanese; Meneghino
- Time zone: UTC+1 (CET)
  - Summer (DST): UTC+2 (CEST)
- Postal code: 20121–20162
- Area code: 0039 02
- Climate: humid subtropical climate (Cfa)
- Patron saint: Saint Ambrose, Doctor of the Church
- Website: comune.milano.it

Milan (Note: English: /mɪˈlæn/ mil-AN, US also /mɪˈlɑːn/ mil-AHN; Milanese: [miˈlãː]; Italian: Milano [miˈlaːno].) is the capital and largest city of the region of Lombardy, in northern Italy, and the seat of the Metropolitan City of Milan. It is the second-largest city in Italy after the country's capital, Rome, with a population of 1,362,863 in 2026. The city's wider metropolitan area is the largest in Italy, and the fourth-largest in the European Union, with an estimated population of 6.55 million. Milan is considered Italy's economic capital, and its metropolitan area accounts for about 20% of the country's GDP.

Founded around 590 BC by a Celtic tribe, Milan was conquered by the Romans in 222 BC, who Latinized the name of the city into Mediolanum. From AD 284 to 402, it served as capital of the western part of the Roman Empire. In the Late Medieval period, the wealthy Duchy of Milan was one of the greatest forces behind the Renaissance. As a major center of the Italian Enlightenment during the Early modern period, Milan's cultural and political struggle against Austrian domination was crucial in the reunification of the Kingdom of Italy. From the 19th century onwards, Milan led the industrial and financial development of Italy.

Milan is a major international center of industry, finance, science, communications, fashion, art and tourism. Milan was classified as an "Alpha" city by the Globalization and World Cities Research Network. Milan's business district hosts Borsa Italiana, Italy's main stock exchange (part of the Euronext consortium, the world's sixth-largest by market capitalization) and the headquarters of numerous national corporations, including eight Fortune 500 Europe companies. As of 2023, Milan and its special metropolitan authority have the largest GDP and the highest per-capita GDP of any Italian province.

Milan is a global fashion capital and a major international tourist destination, being one of the most visited cities in the world, ranked second in Italy after Rome, fifth in Europe and sixteenth in the world. The city is a major cultural center, with museums and art galleries that feature some of the most important collections in the world, including major works by Leonardo da Vinci. Milan hosts numerous educational institutions, including academies and universities that account for 11% of the national total of enrolled students. Milan hosts several international events and fairs, including Milan Fashion Week and the Milan Furniture Fair, which are among the world's largest in terms of revenue, visitors and growth. Milan has many luxury hotels and is the fifth most starred in the world by the Michelin Guide. It hosted the Universal Exposition in 1906 and 2015. In the field of sports, Milan is home to two of Europe's most successful football teams, AC Milan and Internazionale Milano (Inter Milan), and one of Europe's main basketball teams, Olimpia Milano. The city also co-hosted the Winter Olympic and Paralympic games in 2026.

== Etymology ==
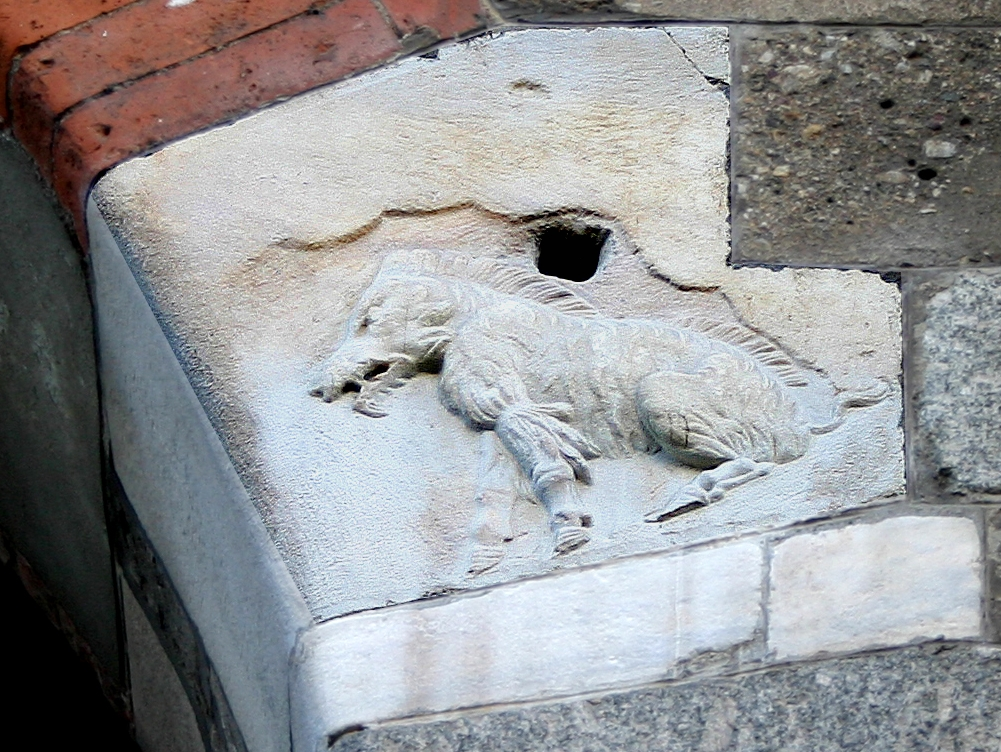
A bas-relief on the Palazzo della Ragione of the scrofa semilanuta ("half-woolly sow") from which, according to a theory, the city's toponym may derive

Milan was founded with the Celtic name of Medhelanon, later Latinized by the ancient Romans into Mediolanum. In Celtic language medhe- meant "middle, center" and the name element -lanon is the Celtic equivalent of Latin -planum "plain", meant "(settlement) in the midst of the plain", or of "place between watercourses" (Celtic medhe = "in the middle, central"; land or lan = "land"), given the presence of the Olona, Lambro, Seveso rivers and the Nirone and Pudiga streams.

The Latin name Mediolanum comes from the Latin words medio (in the middle) and planus (plain). Some scholars believe that lanum comes from the Celtic root lan, meaning an enclosure or demarcated territory (source of the Welsh word llan, meaning "a sanctuary or church", ultimately cognate to English/German Land) in which Celtic communities used to build shrines.

Hence Mediolanum could signify the central town or sanctuary of a Celtic tribe. About sixty Gallo-Roman sites in France bore the name "Mediolanum", for example: Saintes (Mediolanum Santonum) and Évreux (Mediolanum Aulercorum). Another theory links the name to the scrofa semilanuta ("half-woolly sow") an ancient emblem of the city, fancifully accounted for in Andrea Alciato's Emblemata (1584), beneath a woodcut of the first raising of the city walls, where a boar is seen lifted from the excavation, and the etymology of Mediolanum given as "half-wool", explained in Latin and in French.

According to this theory, the foundation of Milan is credited to two Celtic peoples, the Bituriges and the Aedui, having as their emblems a ram and a boar. Therefore "The city's symbol is a wool-bearing boar, an animal of double form, here with sharp bristles, there with sleek wool." Alciato credits Ambrose for his account.

== History ==
=== Celtic era ===
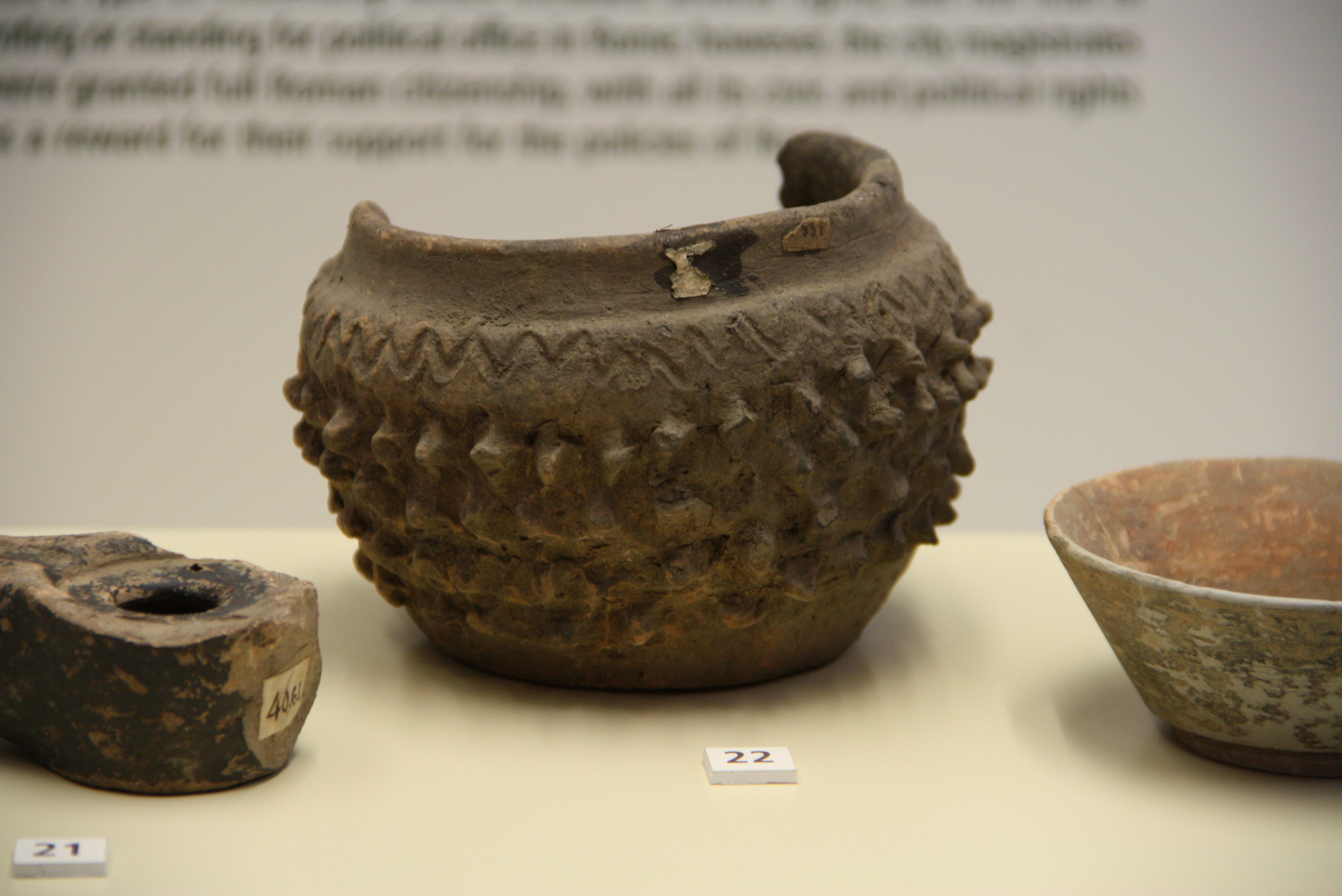
Celtic artifacts from the period before the Roman conquest (3rd–2nd centuries BC), preserved in the Civic Archaeological Museum of Milan

Around 590 BC a Celtic tribe belonging to the Insubres group and belonging to the Golasecca culture settled the city under the name Medhelanon. According to the legend reported by Livy (writing between 27 and 9 BC), the Gaulish king Ambicatus sent his nephew Bellovesus into northern Italy at the head of a party drawn from various Gaulish tribes; Bellovesus allegedly founded the settlement in the times of the Roman monarchy, during the reign of Tarquinius Priscus. Tarquin is traditionally recorded as reigning from 616 to 579 BC, according to ancient Roman historian Titus Livy.

Medhelanon, in particular, was developed around a sanctuary, which was the oldest area of the village. The sanctuary, which consisted of a wooded area in the shape of an ellipse with a central clearing, was aligned according to precise astronomical points. For this reason, it was used for religious gatherings, especially in particular celebratory moments. The sanctuary of Medhelanon was an ellipse with axes of 443 m (1,453 ft) and 323 m (1,060 ft) located near Piazza della Scala.

The urban planning profile was based on these early paths, and on the shape of the sanctuary, reached, in some cases, up to the 19th century and even beyond. For example, the route of the modern Corso Vittorio Emanuele, Piazza del Duomo, Piazza Cordusio and Via Broletto, which is curvilinear, could correspond to the south side of the ellipse of the ancient sanctuary of Medhelanon.

One axis of the Medhelanon sanctuary was aligned towards the heliacal rising of Antares, while the other towards the heliacal rising of Capella. The latter coincided with a Celtic spring festival celebrated on 24 March, while the heliacal rising of Antares corresponded with 11 November, which opened and closed the Celtic year and which coincided with the point where the Sun rose on the winter solstice. About two centuries after the creation of the Celtic sanctuary, the first residential settlements began to be built around it. Medhelanon then transformed from a simple religious center to an urban and then military centre, thus becoming a real village.

The first homes were built just south of the Celtic sanctuary, near the modern Royal Palace of Milan. Subsequently, with the growth of the town centre, other important buildings for the Medhelanon community were built. First, a temple dedicated to the goddess Belisama was built, which was located near the modern Milan Cathedral. Then, near the modern Via Moneta, which is located near today's Piazza San Sepolcro, a fortified building with military functions was built which was surrounded by a defensive moat.

=== Roman times ===
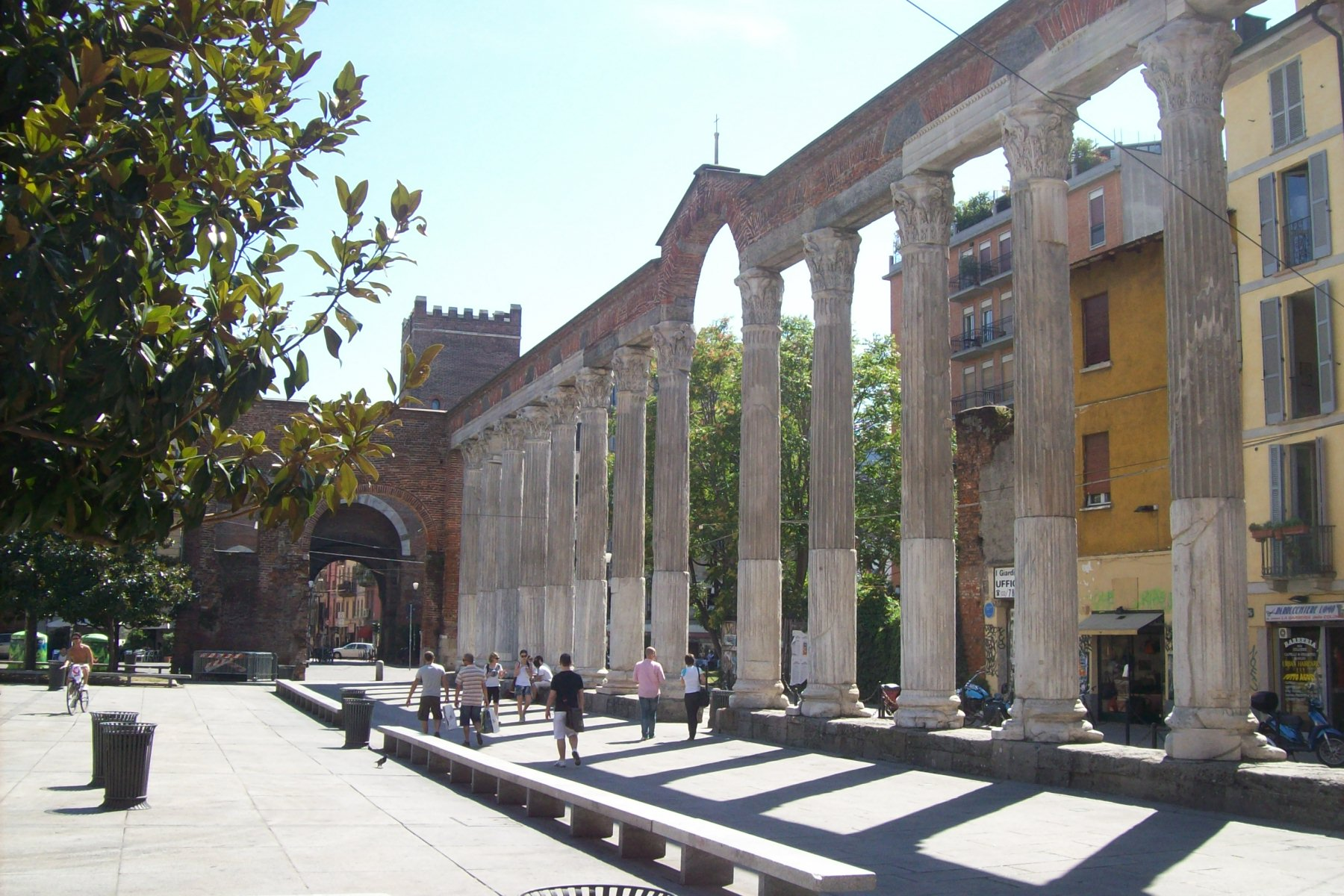
Roman ruins in Milan: the Columns of San Lorenzo

During the Roman Republic, the Romans, led by consul Gnaeus Cornelius Scipio Calvus, fought the Insubres and captured the settlement in 222 BC. The chief of the Insubres then submitted to Rome, giving the Romans control of the settlement. The Romans eventually conquered the entirety of the region, calling the new province "Cisalpine Gaul" (Latin: Gallia Cisalpina)—"Gaul this side of the Alps"—and may have given the city its Latinized name of Mediolanum: in Gaulish *medio- meant "middle, centre" and the name element -lanon is the Celtic equivalent of Latin -planum "plain", thus *Mediolanon (Latinized as Mediolānum) meant "(settlement) in the midst of the plain". Mediolanum became the most important center of Cisalpine Gaul and, in the wake of economic development, in 49 BC, was elevated, within the Lex Roscia, to the status of municipium.

Ruins of the Emperor's palace in Milan located in Via Gorani, where Constantine and Licinius issued the Edict of Milan

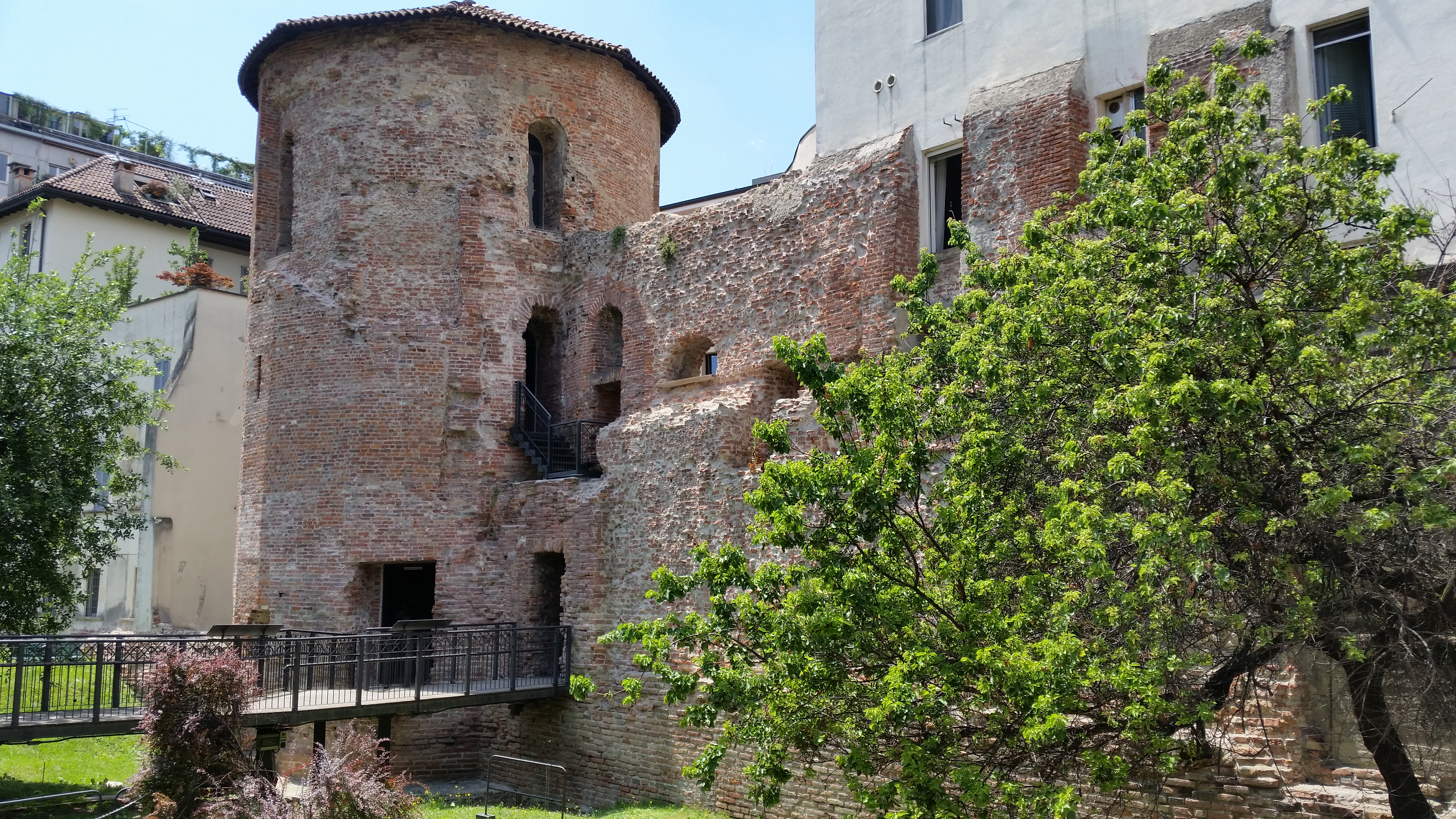
Remains of the Roman walls of Milan located inside the Civic Archaeological Museum of Milan

The ancient Celtic settlement was, from a topographic point of view, superimposed and replaced by the Roman one. The Roman city was then gradually superimposed and replaced by the medieval one. The urban center of Milan has therefore grown constantly and rapidly, until modern times, around the first Celtic nucleus. The original Celtic toponym Medhelanon then changed, as evidenced by a graffiti in Celtic language present on a section of the Roman walls of Milan which dates back to a period following the Roman conquest of the Celtic village, in Mesiolano. In 286, the Roman Emperor Diocletian moved the capital of the Western Roman Empire from Rome to Mediolanum. Diocletian himself chose to reside at Nicomedia in the Eastern Empire, leaving his colleague Maximian at Milan.

During the Augustan age Mediolanum was famous for its schools; it possessed a theatre and an amphitheatre (129.5 x 109.3 m), the third largest in Roman Italy after the Colosseum in Rome and the vast amphitheatre in Capua. A large stone wall encircled the city in Caesar's time, and later was expanded in the late third century AD, by Maximian. Maximian built several gigantic monuments including the large circus (470 × 85 metres) and the thermae or Baths of Hercules, a large complex of imperial palaces and other services and buildings of which few visible traces remain. Maximian increased the city area to 375 acres by surrounding it with a new, larger stone wall (about 4.5 km long) with many 24-sided towers. The monumental area had twin towers; the one included later in the construction of the convent of San Maurizio Maggiore remains 16.6 m high.

It was from Mediolanum that the Emperor Constantine issued what is now known as the Edict of Milan in AD 313, granting tolerance to all religions within the Empire, thus paving the way for Christianity to become the dominant religion of the Empire. Constantine was in Mediolanum to celebrate the wedding of his sister to the Eastern Emperor, Licinius. In 402, the Visigoths besieged the city and the Emperor Honorius moved the Imperial residence to Ravenna. In 452, Attila besieged the city, but the real break with the city's Imperial past came in 539, during the Gothic War, when Uraias (a nephew of Witiges, formerly King of the Italian Ostrogoths) carried out a siege of Milan, and after capitulation, according to Procopius, 300,000 male citizens were executed and the women sold to the allies of the Goths for assisting in the siege. The Lombards took Ticinum as their capital in 572 (renaming it Papia – the modern Pavia), and left early-medieval Milan to the governance of its archbishops.

=== Middle Ages ===
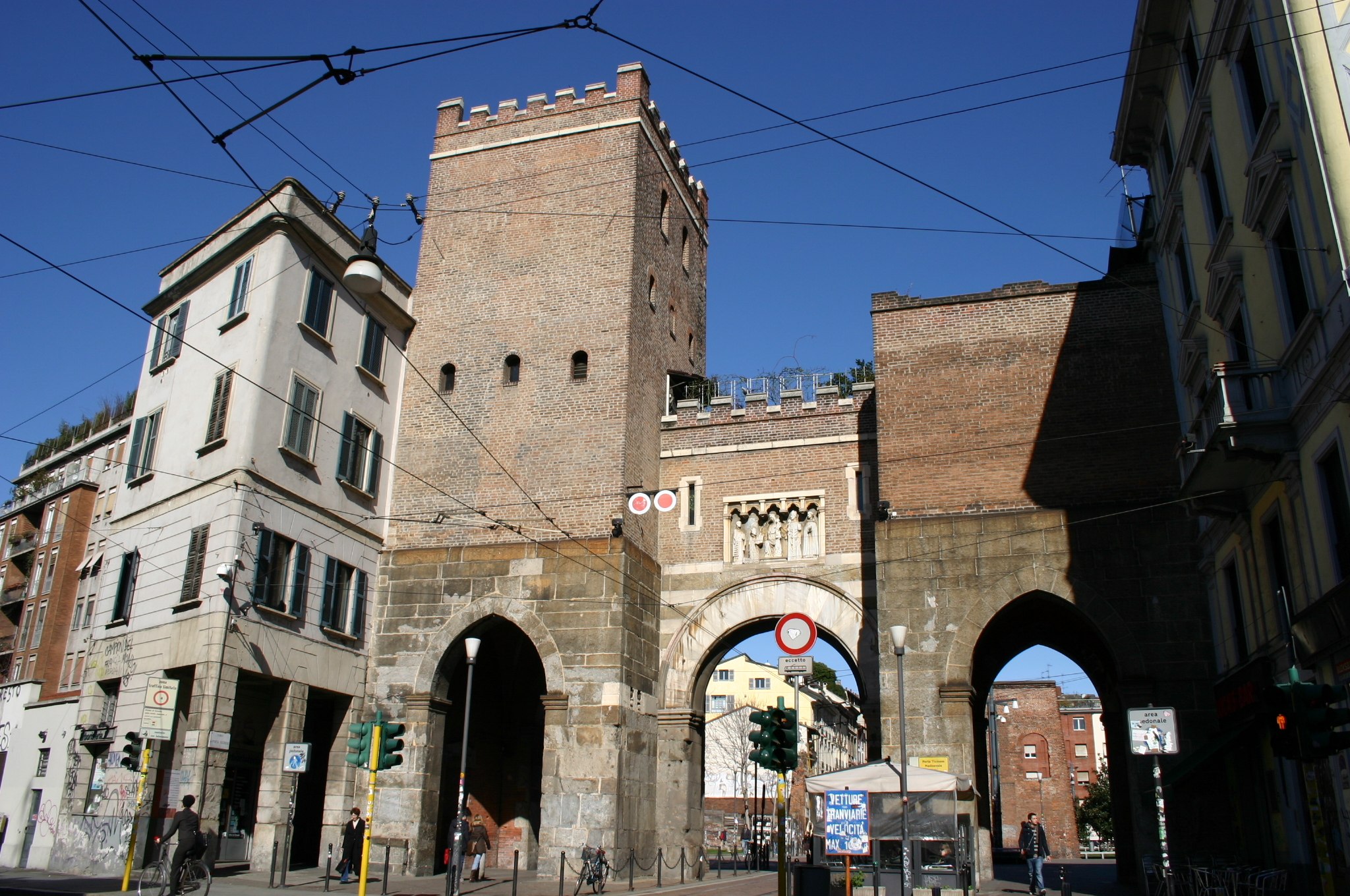
The 12th century Medieval Porta Ticinese is one of the city's three medieval gates that still exist in modern Milan.

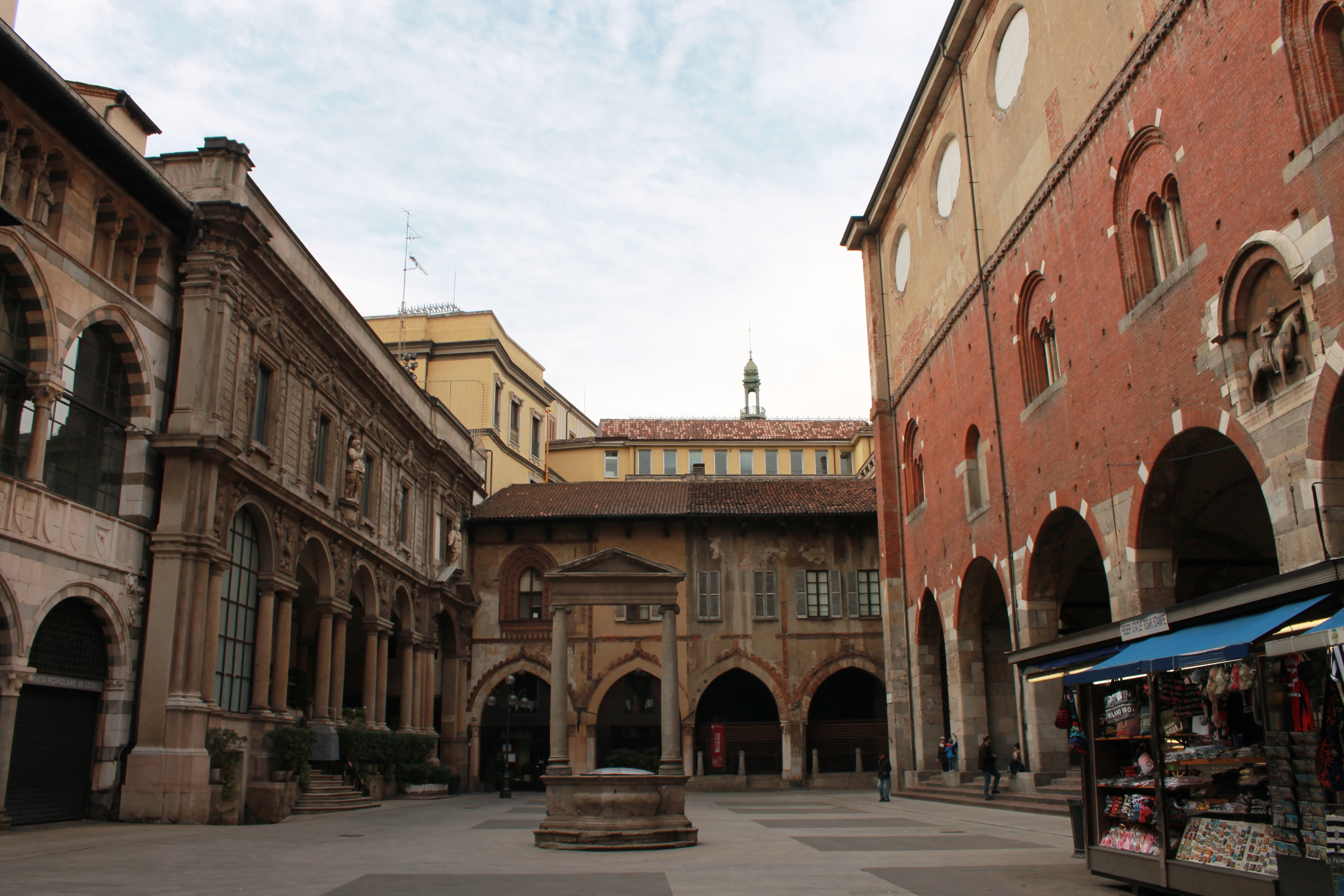
Piazza Mercanti was the heart of the city in the Middle Ages.

After the siege of the city by the Visigoths in 402, the imperial residence moved to Ravenna. Attila, King of the Huns, sacked and devastated the city in 452 AD. In 539 the Ostrogoths conquered and destroyed Milan during the Gothic War against Byzantine Emperor Justinian I. In the summer of 569 the Lombards (from whom the name of the Italian region Lombardy derives), conquered Milan, overpowering the small Byzantine garrison left for its defence. Some Roman structures remained in use in Milan under Lombard rule. Milan surrendered to Charlemagne and the Franks in 774.

The 11th century saw a reaction against the control of the Holy Roman Emperors. City-states emerged in northern Italy, an expression of the new political power of the cities and their will to fight against all feudal powers. Milan was no exception. It did not take long, however, for the Italian city-states to begin fighting each other to try to limit neighbouring powers. The Milanese destroyed Lodi and continuously warred with Pavia, Cremona and Como, who in turn asked Frederick I Barbarossa for help. In a sally they captured Empress Beatrice and forced her to ride a donkey backward through the city until getting out. Frederick I Barbarossa brought the destruction of much of Milan in 1162.

The Duchy of Milan (1395–1447 and 1450–1796) at the time of Gian Galeazzo Visconti's death in 1402. The Golden Ambrosian Republic (1447–1450) briefly existed between the end of the Visconti period in 1447 and the start of the Sforza period in 1450.

A period of peace followed and Milan prospered as a centre of trade due to its geographical position. During this time, the city was considered one of the largest European cities. As a result of the independence that the Lombard cities gained in the Peace of Constance in 1183, Milan returned to the commune form of local government first established in the 11th century.

In 1395, Gian Galeazzo Visconti became the first Duke of Milan upon receiving the title from Wenceslaus, King of the Romans. In 1447, Filippo Maria Visconti, Duke of Milan, died without a male heir. Following the end of the Visconti line, the Ambrosian Republic was established; it took its name from St. Ambrose, the popular patron saint of the city. Both the Guelph and the Ghibelline factions worked together to bring about the Ambrosian Republic in Milan. In 1450, the Republic collapsed when Milan was conquered by Francesco I of the House of Sforza, which made Milan one of the leading cities of the Italian Renaissance. Under the House of Sforza, Milan experienced a period of great prosperity, which in particular saw the development of mulberry cultivation and silk processing.

Following this economic growth, works such as the Sforza Castle (already existing in the Visconti era under the name of Porta Giovia Castle, but re-adapted, enlarged and completed by the Sforza family) and the Ospedale Maggiore were completed. The Sforzas also managed to attract to Milan personalities such as Leonardo da Vinci, who redesigned and improved the function of the navigli and painted The Last Supper, and Bramante, who worked on the church of Santa Maria presso San Satiro, on the basilica of Sant'Ambrogio and to the church of Santa Maria delle Grazie, influencing the development of the Lombard Renaissance.

=== Early modern ===
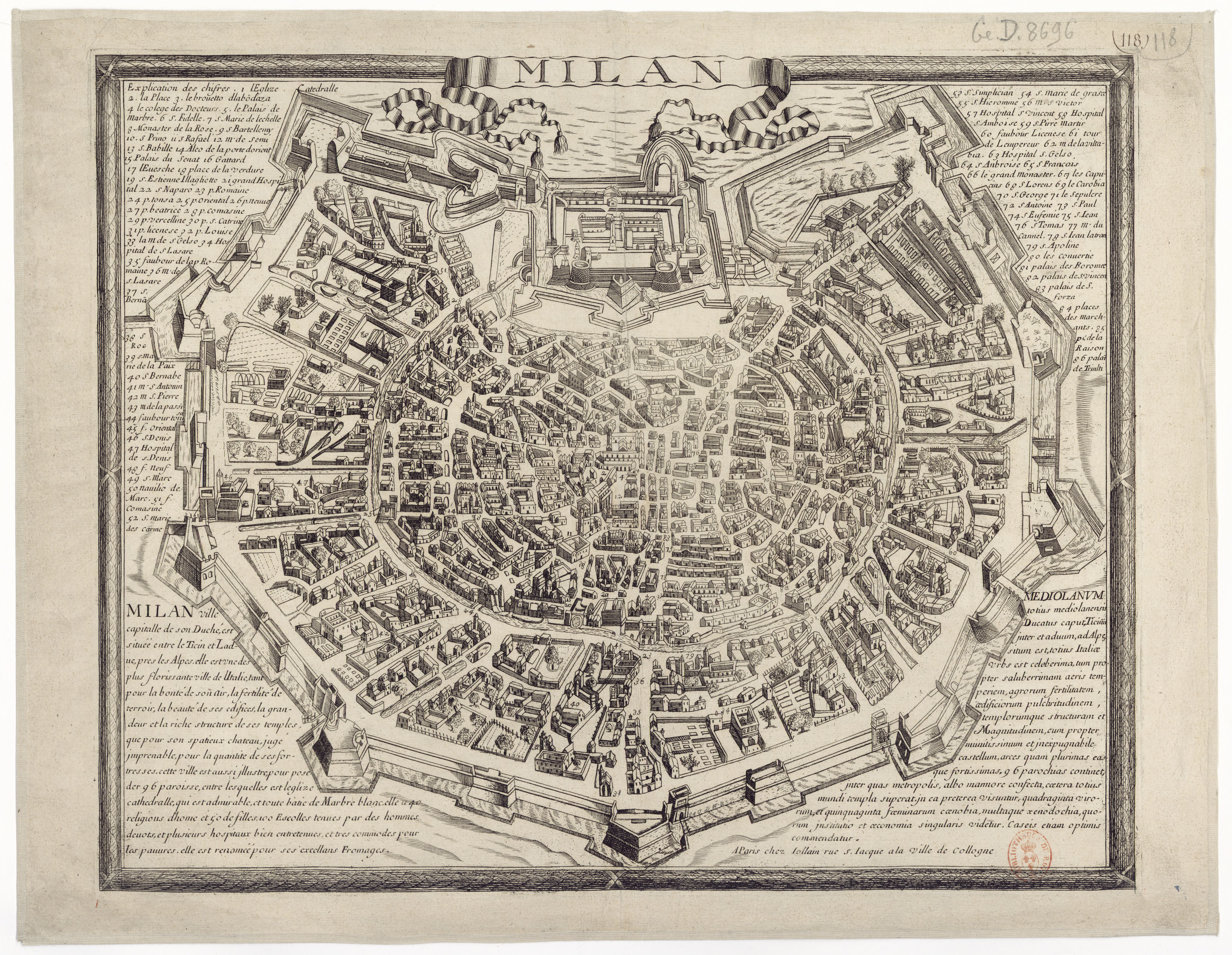
A 1680 map of Milan, with the Spanish walls encircling the city

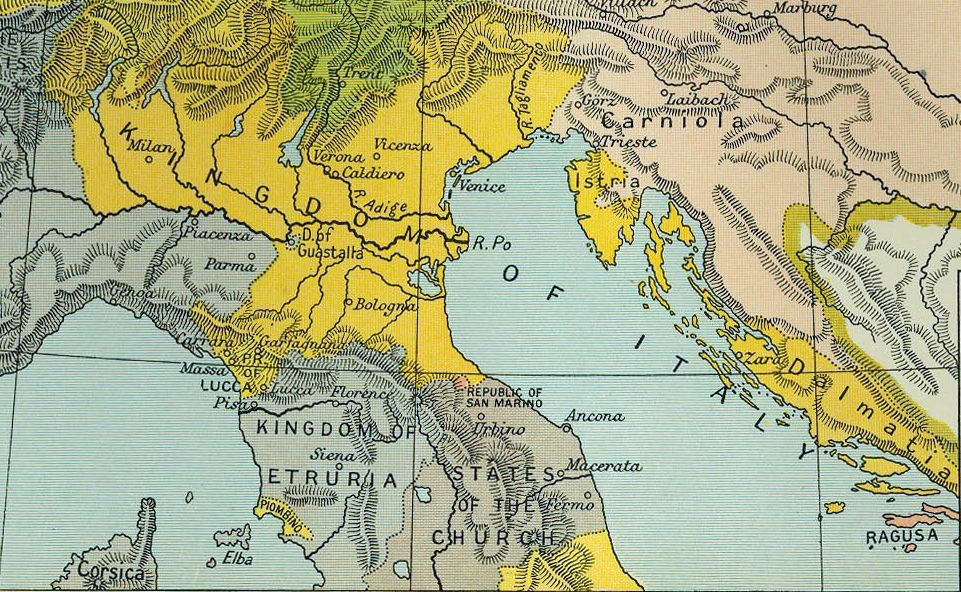
Milan was the capital of the Napoleonic Kingdom of Italy, highlighted in yellow

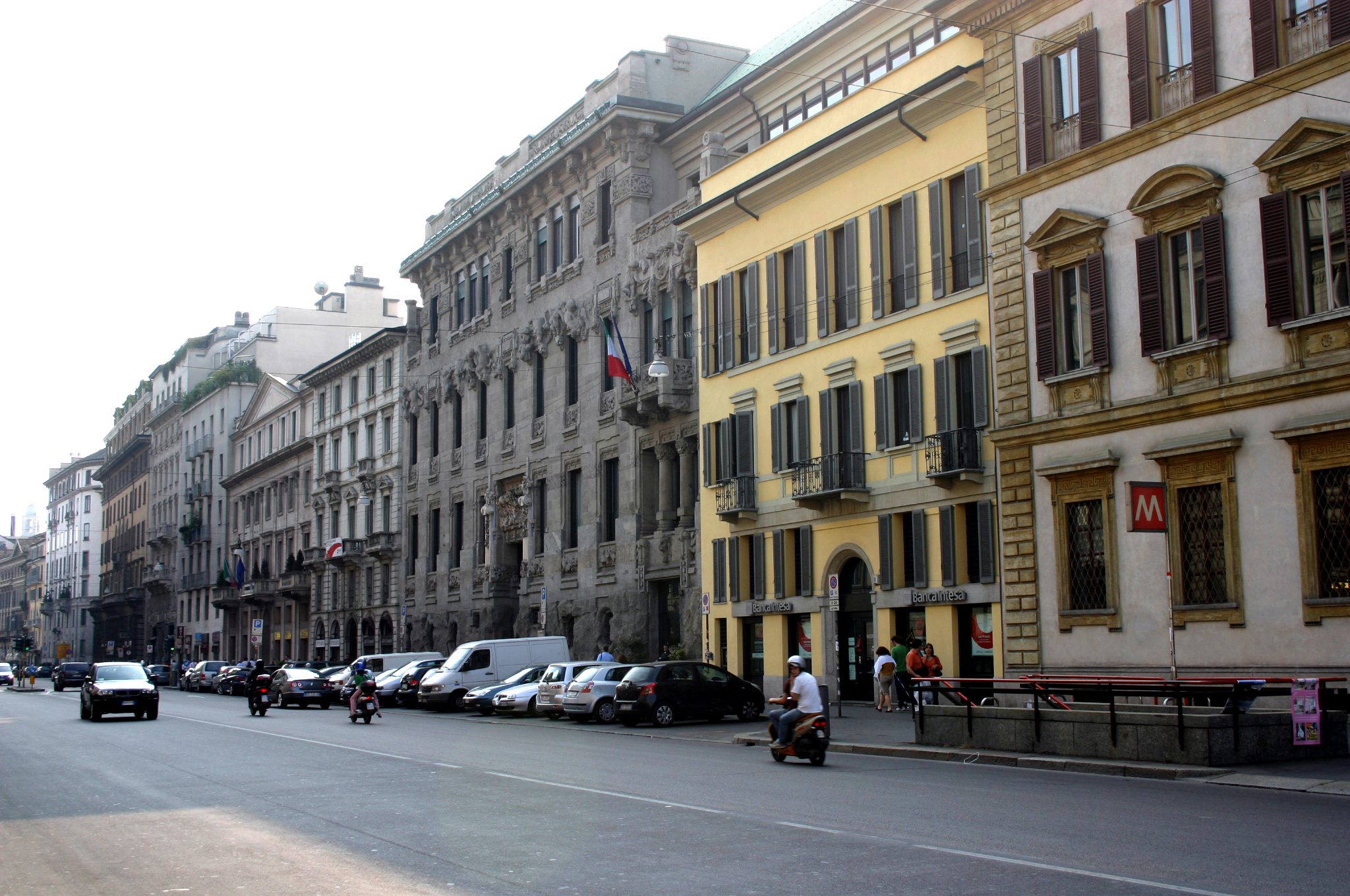
Historic palazzi on Corso Venezia

Milan's last independent ruler, Lodovico il Moro, requested the aid of Charles VIII of France against the other Italian states, eventually unleashing the Italian Wars. The king's cousin, Louis of Orléans, took part in the expedition and realized most of Italy was virtually defenseless. This prompted him to come back a few years later in 1500, and claim the Duchy of Milan for himself, his grandmother having been a member of the ruling Visconti family. At that time, Milan was also defended by Swiss mercenaries. After the victory of Louis's successor François I over the Swiss at the Battle of Marignan, the duchy was promised to the French king François I. When the Emperor Charles V defeated Francis I at the Battle of Pavia in 1525, French rule in the Duchy of Milan came to an end. In 1535, the Sforza line went extinct.

In 1556, Charles V abdicated in favour of his son Philip II and his brother Ferdinand I. Charles's Italian possessions, including Milan, passed to Philip II and the line of the Spanish Habsburgs, while Ferdinand's Austrian line of Habsburgs ruled the Holy Roman Empire. The Great Plague of Milan in 1629–31, that claimed the lives of an estimated 60,000 people out of a population of 130,000, caused unprecedented devastation in the city and was effectively described by Alessandro Manzoni in his masterpiece The Betrothed. This episode was seen by many as the symbol of Spanish bad rule and decadence and is considered one of the last outbreaks of the centuries-long pandemic of plague that began with the Black Death.

In 1700, the Spanish line of Habsburgs was extinguished with the death of Charles II. After his death, the War of the Spanish Succession began in 1701. In 1706, the French were defeated in Ramillies and Turin and were forced to yield northern Italy to the Austrian Habsburgs. In 1713 and 1714, the Treaties of Utrecht and Rastatt formally confirmed Austrian sovereignty over most of Habsburg Spain's Italian possessions including Lombardy and its capital, Milan.

Napoleon invaded Italy in 1796, and Milan was declared capital of the Cisalpine Republic. Later, he declared Milan capital of the Kingdom of Italy and was crowned King of Italy in the cathedral. After Napoleon's occupation ended, the Congress of Vienna returned Lombardy and Milan to Austrian control in 1815.

=== Late modern and contemporary ===
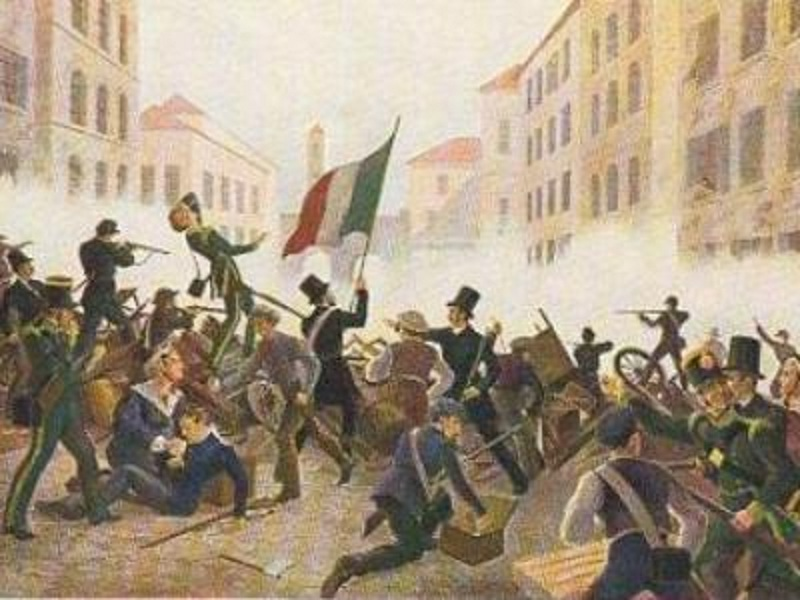
A popular print depicting the "Five Days of Milan" (18–22 March 1848) uprising against Austrian rule

On 18 March 1848, Milan effectively rebelled against Austrian rule, during the so-called "Five Days" (Italian: Le Cinque Giornate), that forced Field Marshal Radetzky to temporarily withdraw from the city. The bordering Kingdom of Piedmont–Sardinia sent troops to protect the insurgents and organised a plebiscite that ratified by a huge majority the unification of Lombardy with Piedmont–Sardinia. But just a few months later the Austrians were able to send fresh forces that routed the Piedmontese army at the Battle of Custoza on 24 July and to reassert Austrian control over northern Italy. About ten years later, however, Italian nationalist politicians, officers and intellectuals such as Cavour, Garibaldi and Mazzini were able to gather a huge consensus and to pressure the monarchy to forge an alliance with the new French Empire of Napoleon III to defeat Austria and establish a large Italian state in the region. At the Battle of Solferino in 1859, French and Italian troops heavily defeated the Austrians that retreated under the Quadrilateral line. Following this battle, Milan and the rest of Lombardy were incorporated into Piedmont-Sardinia, which then proceeded to annex all the other Italian statelets and proclaim the birth of the Kingdom of Italy on 17 March 1861.

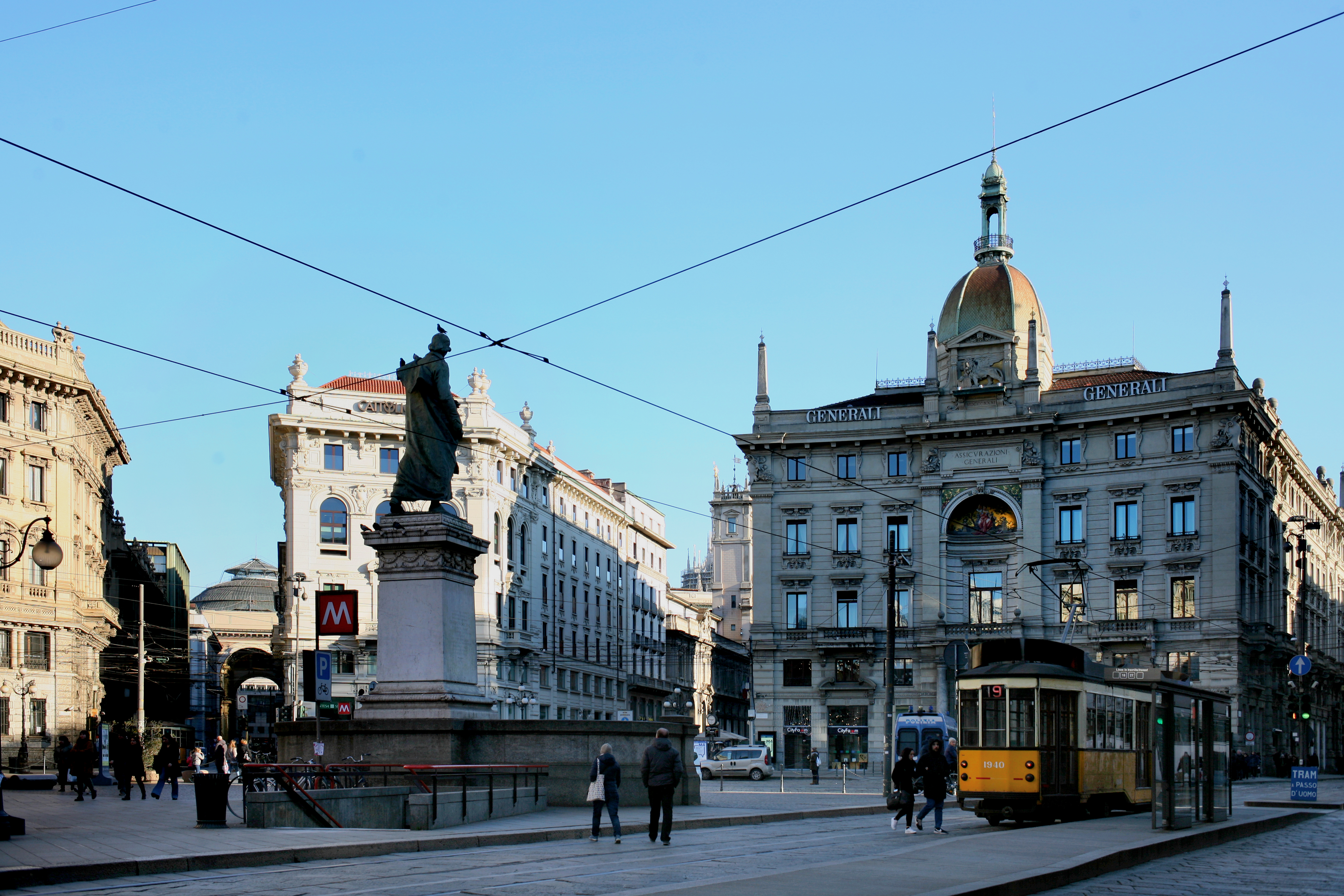
Piazza Cordusio in Milan

The political unification of Italy enhanced Milan's economic dominance over northern Italy. A dense rail network, whose construction had started under Austrian patronage, was completed in a brief time, making Milan the rail hub of northern Italy and, with the opening of the Gotthard (1882) and Simplon (1906) railway tunnels, the major South European rail hub for goods and passenger transport. Indeed, Milan and Venice were among the main stops of the Orient Express that started operating from 1919. Abundant hydroelectric resources allowed the development of a strong steel and textile sector and, as Milanese banks dominated Italy's financial sphere, the city became the country's leading financial centre. In May 1898, Milan was shaken by the Bava Beccaris massacre, a riot related to soaring cost of living.

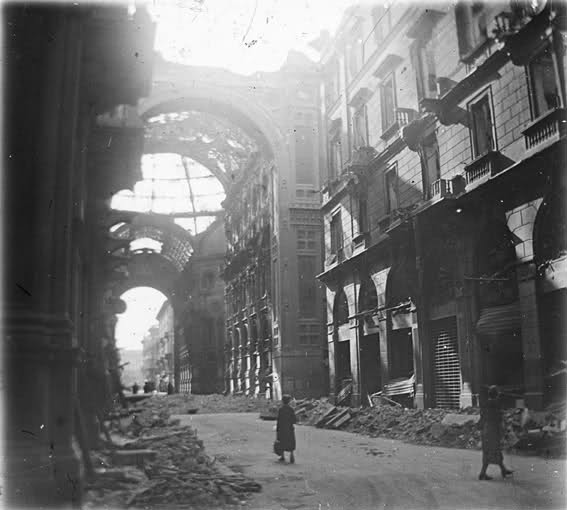
The Galleria Vittorio Emanuele II destroyed by Allied bombings, 1943

Milan's northern location in Italy closer to Europe, secured also a leading role for the city on the political scene. It was in Milan that Benito Mussolini built his political and journalistic careers, and his fascist Blackshirts rallied for the first time in the city's Piazza San Sepolcro; here the future Fascist dictator launched his March on Rome on 28 October 1922. During the Second World War Milan's large industrial and transport facilities suffered extensive damage from Allied bombings that often also hit residential districts. When Italy surrendered in 1943, German forces occupied and plundered most of northern Italy, fueling the birth of a massive resistance guerrilla movement. On 29 April 1945, the American 1st Armored Division was advancing on Milan but, before it arrived, the Italian resistance seized control of the city and executed Mussolini along with his mistress and several regime officers, that were later hanged and exposed in Piazzale Loreto, where one year before some resistance members had been executed.

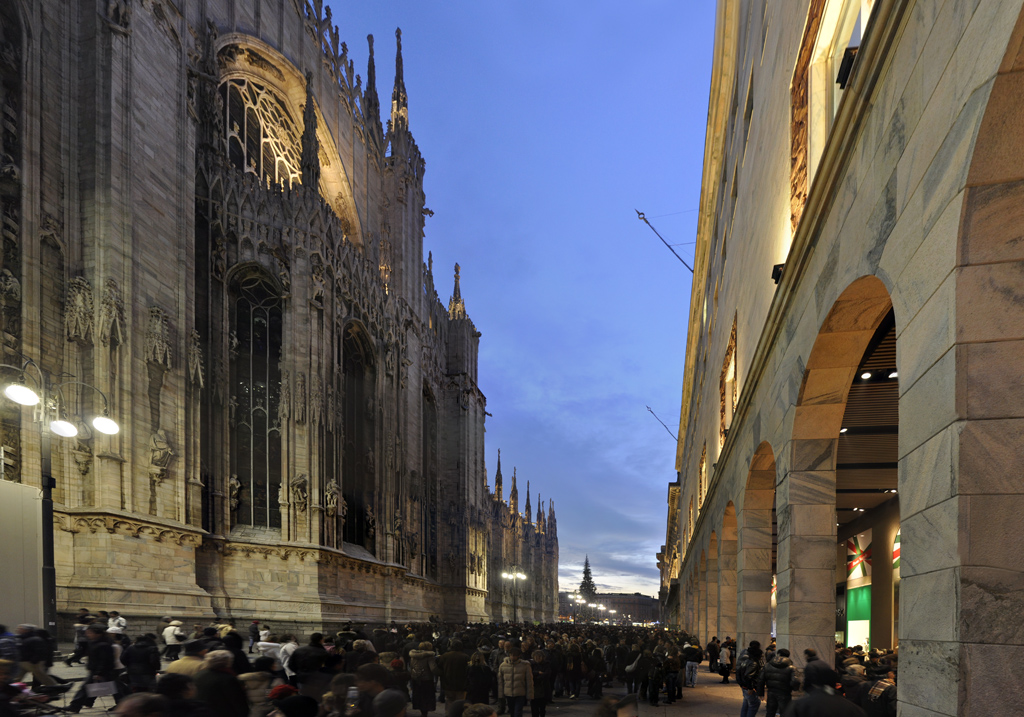
Corso Vittorio Emanuele II, one of the main shopping streets in Milan, with the Duomo at left and La Rinascente department store at right

During the post-war economic boom, the reconstruction effort and the Italian economic miracle attracted a large wave of internal migration (especially from rural areas of southern Italy) to Milan. The population grew from 1.3 million in 1951 to 1.7 million in 1967. During this period, Milan was rapidly rebuilt, with the construction of several innovative and modernist skyscrapers, such as the Torre Velasca and the Pirelli Tower, that soon became the symbols of this new era of prosperity. The economic prosperity was, however, overshadowed in the late 1960s and early 1970s during the so-called Years of lead, when Milan witnessed an unprecedented wave of street violence, labour strikes and political terrorism. The apex of this period of turmoil occurred on 12 December 1969, when a bomb exploded at the National Agrarian Bank in Piazza Fontana, killing 17 people and injuring 88.

In the 1980s, with the international success of Milanese houses (like Armani, Prada, Versace, Moschino and Dolce & Gabbana), Milan became one of the world's fashion capitals. The city saw also a marked rise in international tourism, notably from America and Japan, while the stock exchange increased its market capitalisation more than five-fold. This period led the mass media to nickname the metropolis "Milano da bere", literally "Milan to be drunk".

In the 1990s, Milan was badly affected by Tangentopoli, a political scandal in which many politicians and businessmen were tried for corruption. The city was also affected by a severe financial crisis and a steady decline in textiles, automobile and steel production. Berlusconi's Milano 2 and Milano 3 projects were the most important housing projects of the 1980s and 1990s in Milan and brought to the city new economical and social energy.

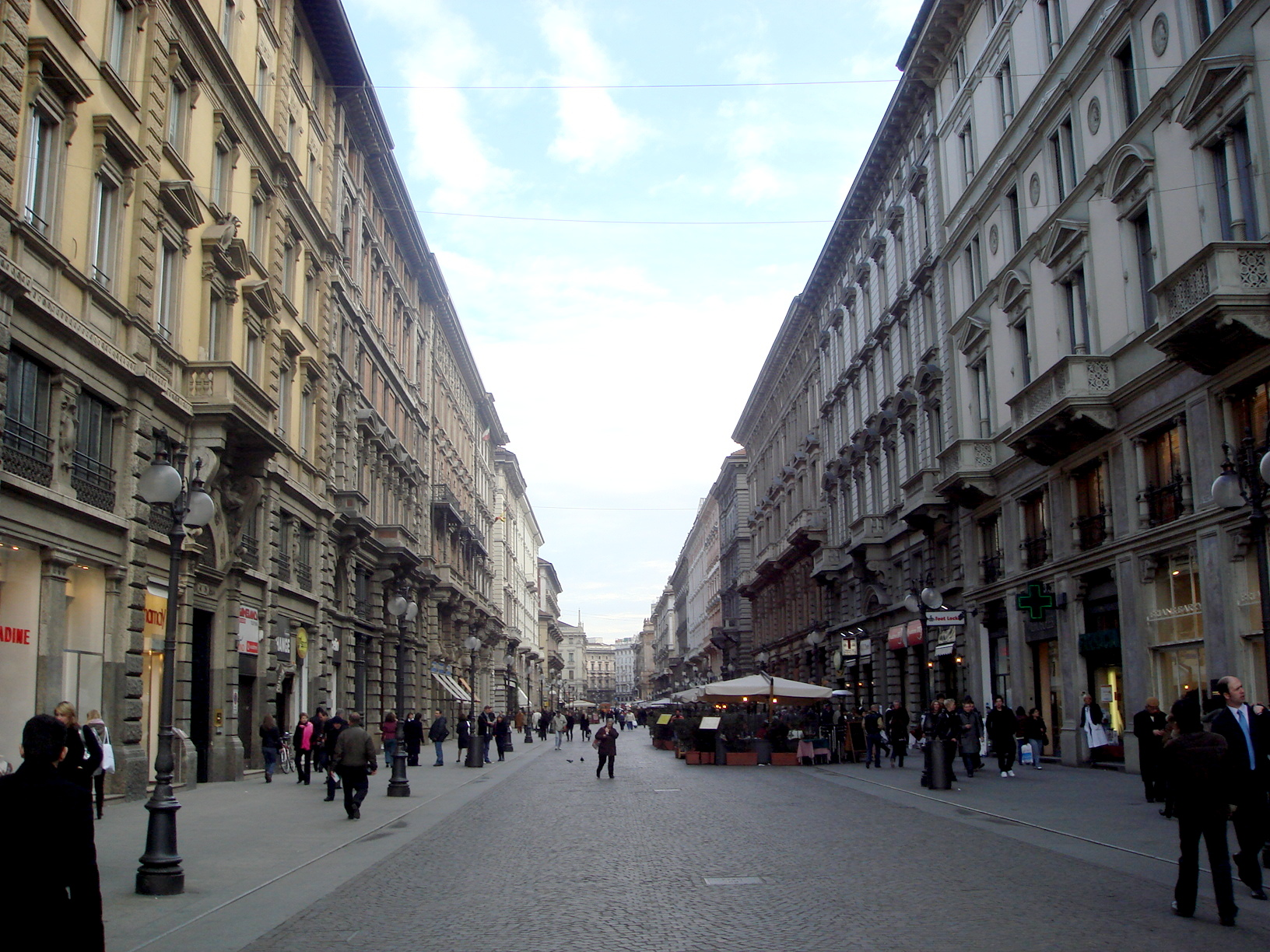
Via Dante in Milan, located between Piazza Cordusio and the Sforza Castle

In the early 21st, century Milan underwent a series of sweeping redevelopments over huge former industrial areas. Two new business districts, Porta Nuova and CityLife, were built in the space of a decade, radically changing the skyline of the city. Its exhibition centre moved to a much larger site in Rho. The long decline in traditional manufacturing has been overshadowed by a great expansion of publishing, finance, banking, fashion design, information technology, logistics and tourism. The city's decades-long population decline seems to have partially reverted in recent years, as the comune gained about 100,000 new residents since the last census. The successful re-branding of the city as a global capital of innovation has been instrumental in its successful bids for hosting large international events such as 2015 Expo and 2026 Winter Olympics.

== Geography ==
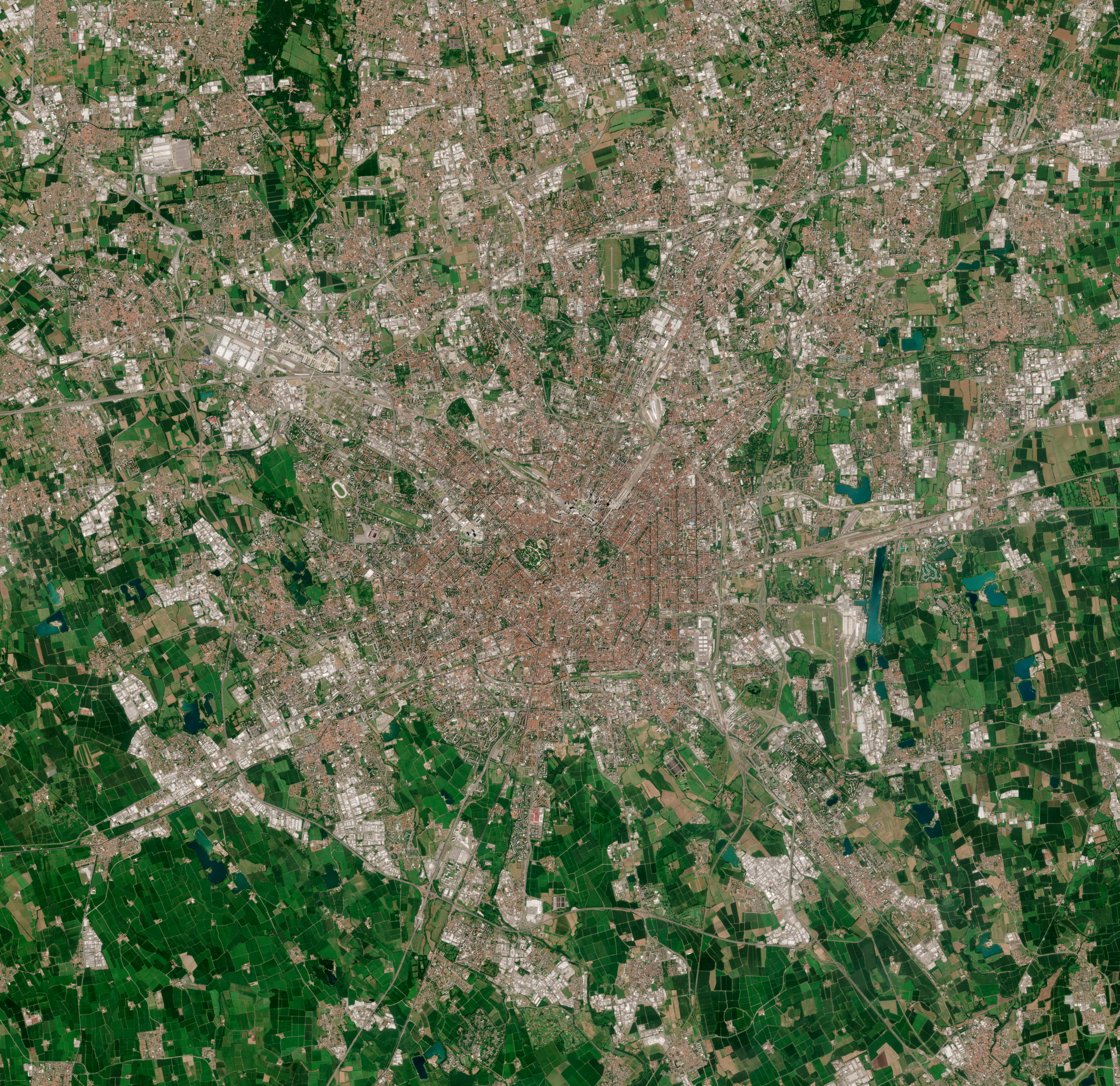
The northward urban sprawl since the mid-20th century is visible in this satellite image of Milan

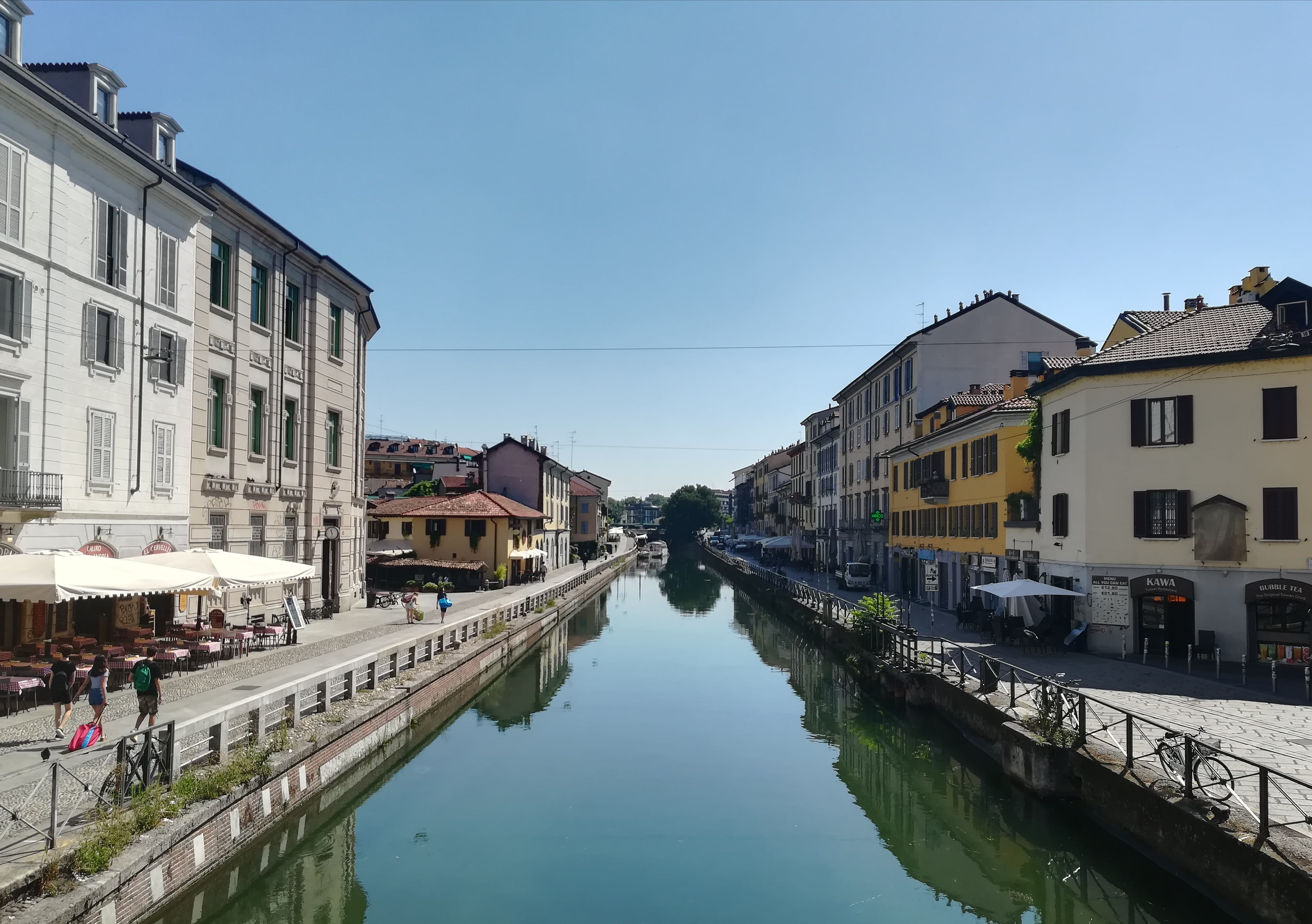
Navigli, a system of interconnected canals in and around Milan, dating back to the Middle Ages

Milan is located in the north-western section of the Po Valley, approximately halfway between the river Po to the south and the foothills of the Alps with the great lakes (Como, Maggiore, and Lugano) to the north, the Ticino river to the west and the Adda to the east. The city's land is flat and the elevation is relatively low; its highest point is 122 m (400 ft) above sea level.

The administrative comune, or city proper, covers an area of about 181 square kilometres (70 sq mi), with a population, in 2025, of 1,366,155 and a population density of 7,520 inhabitants per square kilometre (19,500/sq mi). Milan's continuous urban area extends beyond the city limits. The administrative Metropolitan City of Milan, a special-status provincial authority, covers 1,575 km^{2} (608 sq mi) and in 2024 had a population estimated at 3,245,459, with a resulting density of 2,067/km^{2} (5,350/sq mi), while its wider metropolitan had an estimated population in excess of 6.1 million as of 2025.

The concentric layout of the city centre reflects the Navigli, an ancient system of navigable and interconnected canals, now mostly covered. The suburbs of the city have expanded mainly to the north, swallowing up many comuni along the roads towards Varese, Como, Lecco, and Bergamo. In the 21st century, the Navigli region of Milan is a highly active area with a large number of residential units, bars, and restaurants; it is also a well-known centre for artists.

=== Climate ===
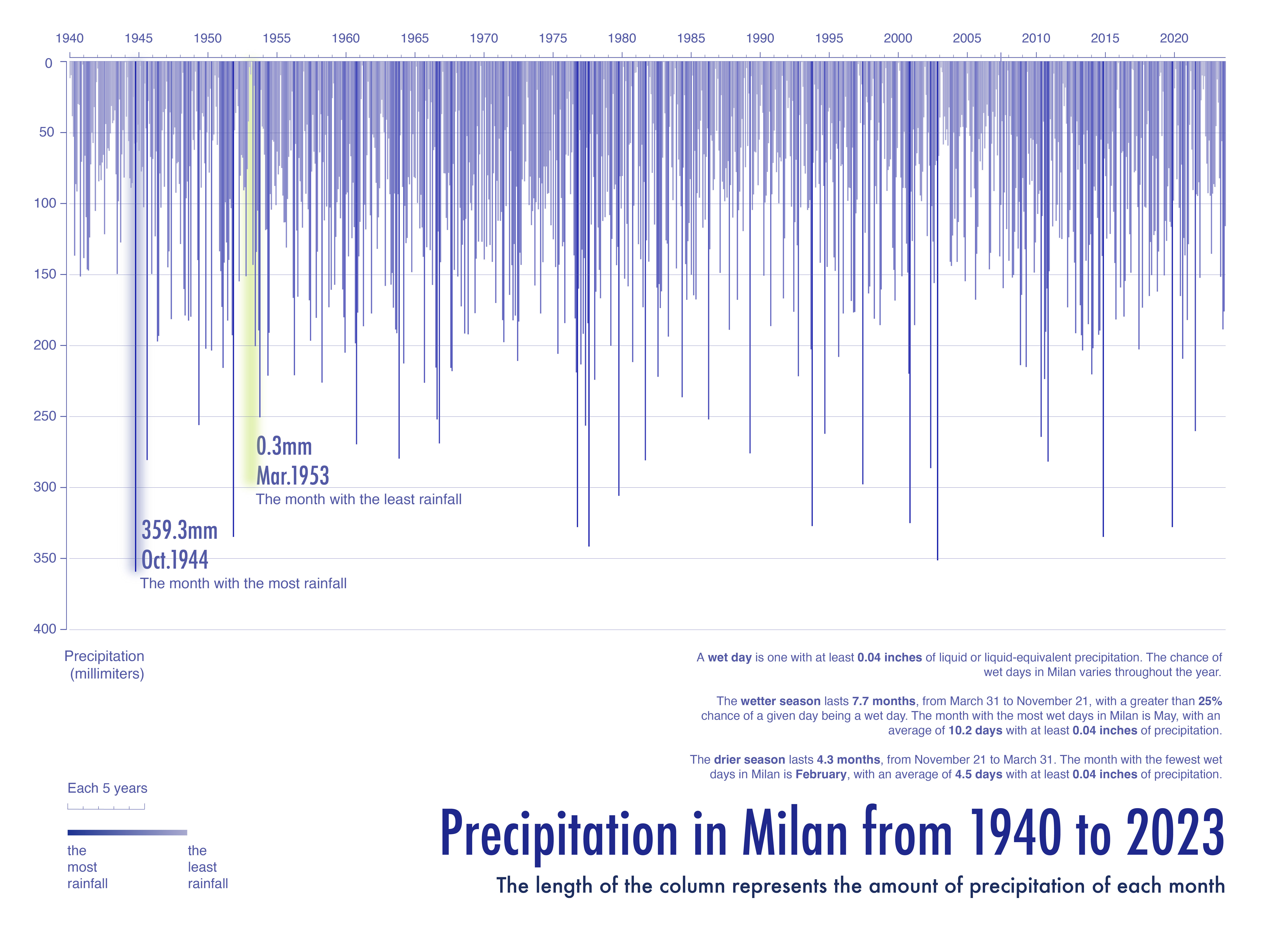
The monthly precipitation in Milan from 1940 to 2023. Data from open-meteo.com

Milan features a mid-latitude, four-season humid subtropical climate (Cfa), according to the Köppen climate classification. Milan's climate is similar to much of Northern Italy's inland plains, with hot, humid summers and cold, foggy winters. The Alps and Apennine Mountains form a natural barrier that protects the city from the major circulations coming from northern Europe and the sea.

During winter daily average temperatures can fall below freezing (0 °C [32 °F]) and accumulations of snow can occur: the historic average of Milan's area is 25 centimetres (10 in) in the period between 1961 and 1990, with a record of 90 centimetres (35 in) in January 1985. In the suburbs the average can reach 36 centimetres (14 in). The city receives on average seven days of snow per year.

The city was often shrouded in thick cloud or fog during winter, although the removal of rice paddies from the southern neighbourhoods and the urban heat island effect have greatly reduced this occurrence since the turn of the 21st century. Occasionally, the Foehn winds cause the temperatures to rise unexpectedly: on 22 January 2012 the daily high reached 16 °C (61 °F) while on 22 February 2012 it reached 21 °C (70 °F). Air pollution levels rise significantly in wintertime when temperature inversions form and persist, causing Milan to be one of Europe's most polluted cities.

Summers in Milan are hot and humidity levels are high with peak temperatures reaching above 35 °C (95 °F). Due to the high humidity, urban heat effect and lack of wind, nighttimes often remain muggy during the summer months. Usually the summer enjoys clearer skies with an average of more than 13 hours of daylight: when precipitation occurs though, it is more likely to be accompanied by thunderstorms and hail.

Springs and autumns are generally pleasant, with temperatures ranging between 10 and 20 °C (50 and 68 °F); these seasons are characterized by higher rainfall, especially in April and May. Relative humidity typically ranges between 45% (comfortable) and 95% (very humid) throughout the year, rarely dropping below 27% (dry) and reaching as high as 100%.

Wind is generally absent: over the course of the year typical wind speeds vary from 0 to 14 km/h (0 to 9 mph) (calm to gentle breeze), rarely exceeding 29 km/h (18 mph) (fresh breeze), except during summer thunderstorms when winds can blow strong. In the spring, gale-force windstorms may happen, generated either by Tramontane blowing from the Alps or by Bora-like winds from the north. Due to its geographic location surrounded by mountains on 3 sides, Milan is among the least windy cities in Europe.

Climate data for Linate Airport, Milan (1991–2020 normals, extremes 1946–present)
Month	Jan	Feb	Mar	Apr	May	Jun	Jul	Aug	Sep	Oct	Nov	Dec	Year
Record high °C (°F)	21.7 (71.1)	23.8 (74.8)	26.9 (80.4)	32.4 (90.3)	35.5 (95.9)	36.6 (97.9)	37.2 (99.0)	39.3 (102.7)	33.2 (91.8)	28.2 (82.8)	25.5 (77.9)	24.5 (76.1)	39.3 (102.7)
Mean maximum °C (°F)	15.6 (60.1)	18.2 (64.8)	22.4 (72.3)	25.4 (77.7)	30.2 (86.4)	33.8 (92.8)	35.4 (95.7)	35.1 (95.2)	30.9 (87.6)	25.1 (77.2)	19.1 (66.4)	15.2 (59.4)	36.5 (97.7)
Mean daily maximum °C (°F)	7.3 (45.1)	10.0 (50.0)	15.5 (59.9)	19.3 (66.7)	23.9 (75.0)	28.1 (82.6)	30.7 (87.3)	29.9 (85.8)	25.5 (77.9)	19.0 (66.2)	12.4 (54.3)	7.4 (45.3)	19.1 (66.3)
Daily mean °C (°F)	3.2 (37.8)	5.2 (41.4)	9.9 (49.8)	13.8 (56.8)	18.5 (65.3)	22.7 (72.9)	25.1 (77.2)	24.4 (75.9)	19.9 (67.8)	14.4 (57.9)	8.7 (47.7)	3.9 (39.0)	14.1 (57.5)
Mean daily minimum °C (°F)	−0.4 (31.3)	0.6 (33.1)	4.4 (39.9)	8.4 (47.1)	12.8 (55.0)	17.2 (63.0)	19.3 (66.7)	18.8 (65.8)	14.9 (58.8)	10.2 (50.4)	5.3 (41.5)	0.6 (33.1)	9.3 (48.8)
Mean minimum °C (°F)	−6.8 (19.8)	−5.4 (22.3)	−2.3 (27.9)	2.1 (35.8)	6.8 (44.2)	11.4 (52.5)	13.9 (57.0)	13.7 (56.7)	9.1 (48.4)	3.2 (37.8)	−1.9 (28.6)	−5.8 (21.6)	−8.1 (17.4)
Record low °C (°F)	−15.0 (5.0)	−15.6 (3.9)	−7.4 (18.7)	−2.5 (27.5)	−0.8 (30.6)	5.6 (42.1)	8.4 (47.1)	8.0 (46.4)	3.0 (37.4)	−2.3 (27.9)	−6.2 (20.8)	−13.6 (7.5)	−15.6 (3.9)
Average precipitation mm (inches)	35.9 (1.41)	38.2 (1.50)	42.2 (1.66)	57.7 (2.27)	70.3 (2.77)	67.4 (2.65)	44.2 (1.74)	82.2 (3.24)	73.4 (2.89)	82.0 (3.23)	112.4 (4.43)	45.8 (1.80)	751.7 (29.59)
Average precipitation days (≥ 1.0 mm)	4.7	4.5	5.4	7.2	8.4	6.6	4.5	5.5	5.1	6.6	8.3	5.7	72.5
Average relative humidity (%)	78.9	73.6	68.0	67.7	67.2	66.9	66.2	67.4	70.0	76.5	81.0	81.8	72.1
Average dew point °C (°F)	0.2 (32.4)	0.8 (33.4)	3.9 (39.0)	7.0 (44.6)	11.2 (52.2)	14.7 (58.5)	16.6 (61.9)	16.8 (62.2)	13.4 (56.1)	10.1 (50.2)	5.9 (42.6)	1.2 (34.2)	8.5 (47.3)
Mean monthly sunshine hours	101.4	127.7	188.5	197.4	236.3	269.6	312.2	262.3	199.3	142.5	95.1	85.1	2,217.4
Percentage possible sunshine	35.7	43.3	51.0	48.6	51.1	57.5	65.7	60.1	53.1	42.0	33.5	31.3	49.6
Source 1: NOAA NCEI
Source 2: Istituto Superiore per la Protezione e la Ricerca Ambientale

Climate data for Malpensa Airport, Milan (1961–1990 normals, extremes 1951–present)
Month	Jan	Feb	Mar	Apr	May	Jun	Jul	Aug	Sep	Oct	Nov	Dec	Year
Record high °C (°F)	22.4 (72.3)	24.4 (75.9)	28.9 (84.0)	31.6 (88.9)	35.1 (95.2)	37.6 (99.7)	38.2 (100.8)	38.8 (101.8)	33.9 (93.0)	29.8 (85.6)	22.8 (73.0)	20.8 (69.4)	38.8 (101.8)
Mean daily maximum °C (°F)	6.1 (43.0)	8.6 (47.5)	13.1 (55.6)	17.0 (62.6)	21.3 (70.3)	25.5 (77.9)	28.6 (83.5)	27.6 (81.7)	24.0 (75.2)	18.2 (64.8)	11.2 (52.2)	6.9 (44.4)	17.3 (63.2)
Daily mean °C (°F)	0.9 (33.6)	3.1 (37.6)	6.8 (44.2)	10.7 (51.3)	15.2 (59.4)	19.1 (66.4)	22.0 (71.6)	21.2 (70.2)	17.8 (64.0)	12.3 (54.1)	6.0 (42.8)	1.7 (35.1)	11.4 (52.5)
Mean daily minimum °C (°F)	−4.4 (24.1)	−2.5 (27.5)	0.4 (32.7)	4.3 (39.7)	9.0 (48.2)	12.6 (54.7)	15.3 (59.5)	14.8 (58.6)	11.5 (52.7)	6.4 (43.5)	0.7 (33.3)	−3.6 (25.5)	5.4 (41.7)
Record low °C (°F)	−18.0 (−0.4)	−17.8 (0.0)	−12.2 (10.0)	−9.0 (15.8)	−5.2 (22.6)	0.6 (33.1)	4.7 (40.5)	3.0 (37.4)	0.5 (32.9)	−6.2 (20.8)	−13.6 (7.5)	−15.2 (4.6)	−18.0 (−0.4)
Average precipitation mm (inches)	67.5 (2.66)	77.1 (3.04)	99.7 (3.93)	106.3 (4.19)	132.0 (5.20)	93.3 (3.67)	66.8 (2.63)	97.5 (3.84)	73.2 (2.88)	107.4 (4.23)	106.3 (4.19)	54.6 (2.15)	1,081.7 (42.61)
Average precipitation days (≥ 1.0 mm)	6.4	6.1	7.6	8.8	10.4	8.5	6.1	7.5	5.7	6.7	7.9	5.5	87.2
Average relative humidity (%)	78	76	69	73	74	74	74	73	74	77	80	80	75
Source 1: NOAA
Source 2: KNMI

== Demographics ==
Historical population
Year	Pop.	±%
1861	267,618	—
1871	290,514	+8.6%
1881	354,041	+21.9%
1901	538,478	+52.1%
1911	701,401	+30.3%
1921	818,148	+16.6%
1931	960,660	+17.4%
1936	1,115,768	+16.1%
1951	1,274,187	+14.2%
1961	1,582,474	+24.2%
1971	1,732,068	+9.5%
1981	1,604,844	−7.3%
1991	1,369,295	−14.7%
2001	1,256,211	−8.3%
2011	1,242,123	−1.1%
2021	1,349,930	+8.7%
Source: ISTAT

As of 2026, the population is 1,362,863, of which 48.7% are male, and 51.3% are female. Minors make up 14.2% of the population, and seniors make up 22.7%.

The population of Milan today is lower than its historical peak. With rapid industrialization in post-war years, the population of Milan peaked at 1,743,427 in 1973. Thereafter, during the following decades, about one third of the population moved to the outer belt of suburbs and new satellite settlements that grew around the city proper.

Today, Milan's conurbation extends well beyond the borders of the city proper and of its special-status provincial authority: its contiguous built-up urban area was home to 5.27 million people in 2015, while its wider metropolitan area, the largest in Italy and fourth largest in the EU, is estimated to have a population in excess of 6.1 million as of 2025.

=== Immigration ===
As of 2025, immigrants make up 22.2% of the population. The 5 largest foreign countries of birth are Egypt, the Philippines, China, Peru, and Sri Lanka.

Foreign-born population (2025)
Country of birth	Population
Egypt	44,127
Philippines	31,657
China	27,877
Peru	19,493
Sri Lanka	13,201
Bangladesh	11,915
Romania	10,359
Ukraine	9,684
Morocco	9,202
Ecuador	9,189
Brazil	6,512
Albania	6,275
France	5,915
El Salvador	5,891
Russia	4,942

Region of birth (2025)
1. Italy 1,062,711 (77.9%)
2. EU 32,276 (2.37%)
3. Rest of Europe 33,771 (2.48%)
4. Africa 70,914 (5.20%)
5. Asia 106,969 (7.84%)
6. Americas 57,154 (4.19%)
7. Oceania 494 (0.04%)

After World War II, Milan experienced two main waves of immigration: the first, dating from the 1950s to the early 1970s, saw a large influx of migrants from poorer and rural areas within Italy; the second, starting from the late 1980s, has been characterized by the preponderance of foreign-born immigrants.

The early period coincided with the so-called Italian economic miracle of postwar years, an era of extraordinary growth based on rapid industrial expansion and great public works, that brought to the city a large influx of over 400,000 people, mainly from rural and underdeveloped Southern Italy.

Decades of continuing high immigration have made the city one of the most cosmopolitan and multicultural in Italy. Immigrants came mainly from Africa (in particular Eritreans, Egyptians, Moroccans, Senegalese and Nigerian), and the former socialist countries of Eastern Europe (notably Albanians, Romanians, Ukrainians, Macedonians, Moldovans, and Russians), in addition to a growing number of Asians (in particular Chinese, Sri Lankans and Filipinos) and Latin Americans (Mainly South Americans). At the beginning of the 1990s, Milan already had a population of foreign-born residents of approximately 58,000 (or 4% of the then population), that rose rapidly to over 117,000 by the end of the decade (about 9% of the total).

Milan is home to the second-largest East Asian community in Europe after Paris, with the Philippines and China, making up about a quarter of its foreign population (around 76,000 out of 301,000 in 2023). Another 4,000 foreigners come from other East Asian countries; notably, Milan hosts more than 2,000 Japanese nationals and 1,000 Koreans, excluding those who also hold Italian citizenship. Foreigners holding East-Asian citizenship thus make up around 5.36% of the city's population. Milan notably hosts the oldest and largest (along with Prato) Chinese community in Italy, with around 37,000 people in 2023, excluding Italians of Chinese descent such as immigrants who have acquired Italian citizenship or their descendants. Situated in the 8th district, and centered on Via Paolo Sarpi, an important commercial avenue, the Milanese Chinatown was originally established in the 1920s by immigrants from Qingtian and Wencheng in Zhejiang, and used to engage in the trade of stone carving, as well as running textile and leather workshops. Milan also hosts a Japanese International school as well as various Chinese schools throughout the city.

The city also hosts an historical African community originating from the Horn of Africa. As of 2023, there were around 4,000 Eritrean, Ethiopian or Somali-born people living in Milan, the overwhelming majority being double-citizens of Italy, and not counting second and third generation migrants. The three countries were all Italian colonies at a time, from 1869 (Eritrea) to 1943 (East African campaign). Due to the historical links with Italy, a small community originating from the Horn of Africa has established its presence near Porta Venezia district starting from the 1970s. It is estimated that in the "Asmarina" area (Little Asmara) there are around 2,000-2,500 people from the Horn of Africa still living there, along with multiple restaurants, institutes as well as an Ethiopian Church.

Another notable area with a large presence of foreign residents coming from a specific country is the so-called "quadrilatero di San Siro" or "San Siro casbah" in reference to the large Arab-speaking population living in the area. The neighbourhood, consisting of around 6,000 municipal flats, is characterised by the fact of having an estimated 25% share of Arab-speaking inhabitants, mostly hailing from Egypt. The area has often been described as a banlieue within Milan and has historically had a higher crime rate than the rest of the city. Nevertheless, in recent years many projects have been presented so as to mitigate the marginalisation of its inhabitants. Other areas hosting large Arabic-speaking populations include Maciachini-Imbonati, Corvetto, Comasina and piazza Arcole.

Milan has a substantial English-speaking community (around 4,500 US citizens, British, Irish and Australian expatriates, excluding double-citizens), and several English schools and English-language publications, such as Hello Milano, Where Milano and Easy Milano.

=== Religion ===
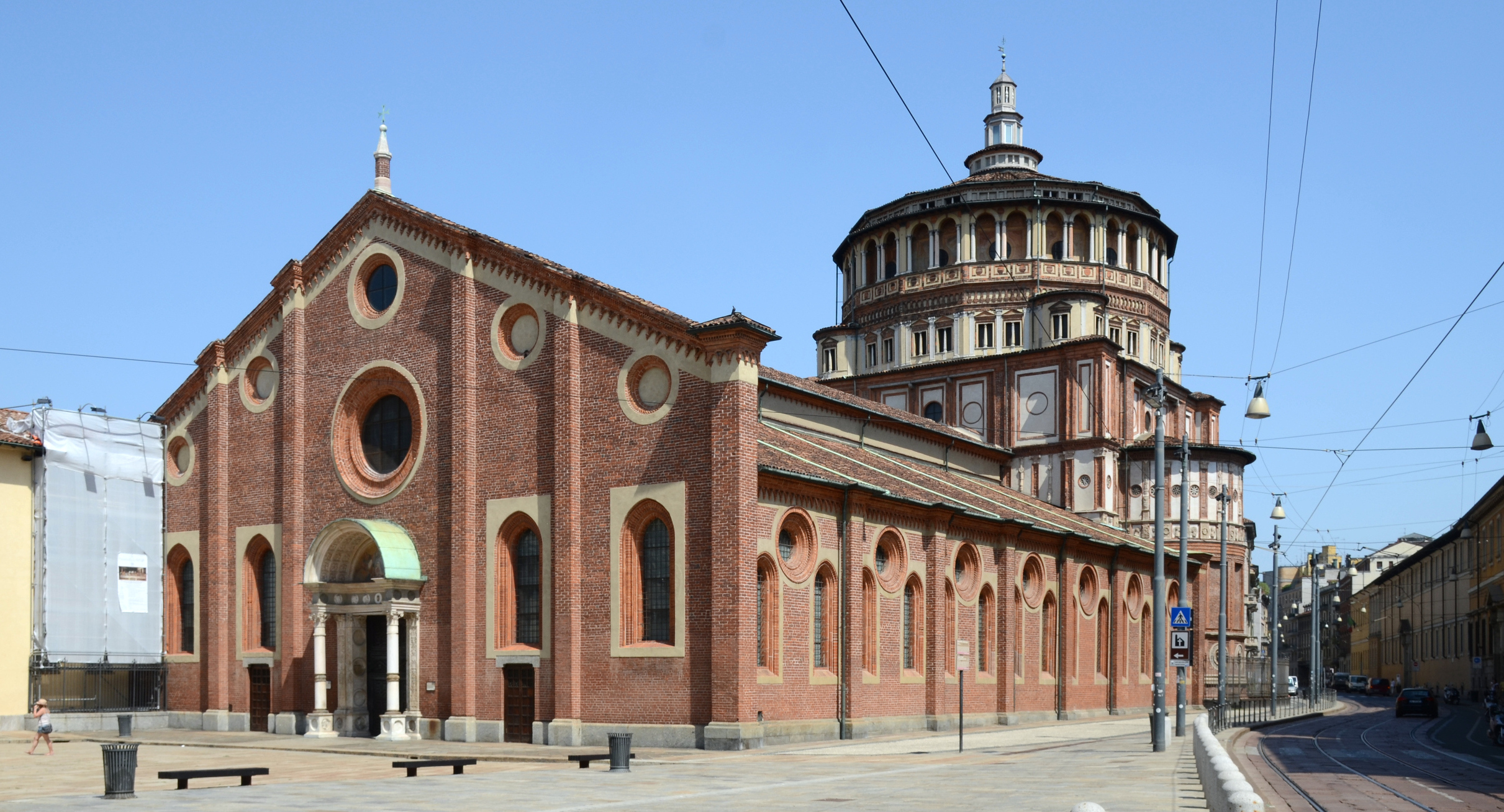
Santa Maria delle Grazie was completed in 1497

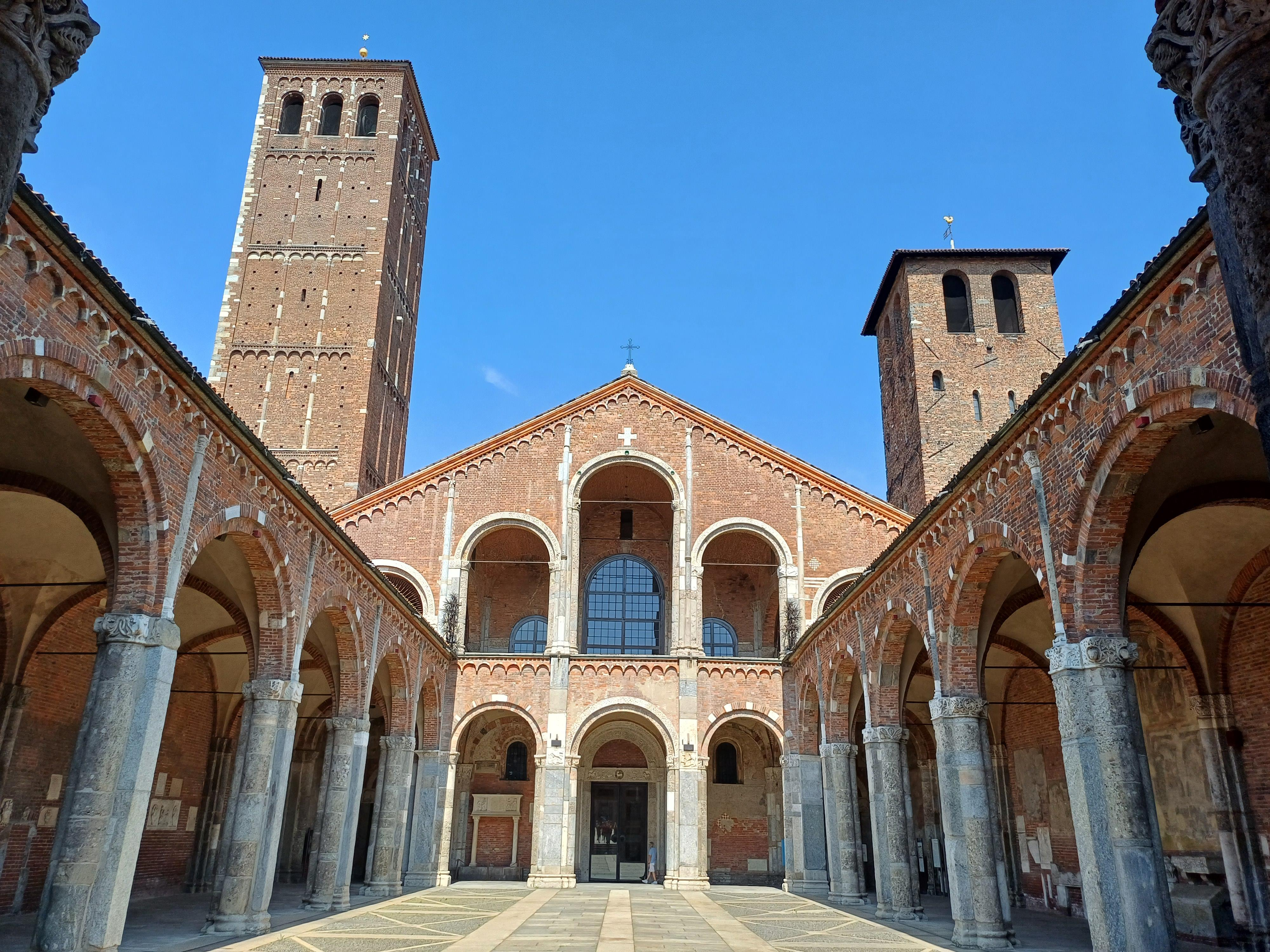
St. Ambrose Basilica dates back to AD 379–386.

Milan's population, like that of Italy as a whole, is mostly Catholic. It is the seat of the Archdiocese of Milan. Greater Milan is also home to Protestant, Eastern Orthodox, Jewish, Muslim, Hindu, Sikh and Buddhist communities.

Milan has been a Christian-majority city since the late Roman Empire. Its religious history was marked by the figure of St. Ambrose, whose heritage includes the Ambrosian Rite (Italian: Rito ambrosiano), used by some five million Catholics in the greater part of the Archdiocese of Milan, which consider the largest in Europe. The Rite varies slightly from the canonical Roman Rite liturgy, with differences in the mass, liturgical year (Lent starts four days later than in the Roman Rite), baptism, rite of funerals, priest clothes and sacred music (use of the Ambrosian chant rather than Gregorian).

In addition, the city is home to the largest Orthodox community in Italy. Lombardy is the seat of at least 78 Orthodox parishes and monasteries, the vast majority of them located in the area of Milan. The main Romanian Orthodox church in Milan is the Catholic church of Our Lady of Victory (Chiesa di Santa Maria della Vittoria), currently granted for use to the local Romanian community. Similarly, the point of reference for the followers of the Russian Orthodox Church is the Catholic church of San Vito in Pasquirolo.

The Jewish community of Milan is the second largest in Italy after Rome, with about 10,000 members, mainly Sephardi. The main city synagogue, Hechal David u-Mordechai Temple, was built by architect Luca Beltrami in 1892 and is also the community's main headquarters, is located in Via della Guastalla. The interior was renovated in 1997.

Milan hosts also one of the largest Muslim communities in Italy, and the city saw the construction of the country's first new mosque featuring a dome and minaret, since the destruction of the ancient mosques of Lucera in the year 1300. In 2014 the City Council agreed on the construction of a new mosque amid bitter political debate, since it is strenuously opposed by right-wing parties such as the Northern League. As of 2018, the Muslim population is estimated at 9% of the city's population.

Currently, accurate statistics on the Hindu and Sikh presence in Milan metro area are not available; however, various sources estimate that about 40% of the total Indian population living in Italy, or about 50,000 individuals, reside in Lombardy, where a number of Hindu and Sikh temples exist and where they form the largest such communities in Europe after the ones in Britain.

== Administration ==
=== Municipal government ===
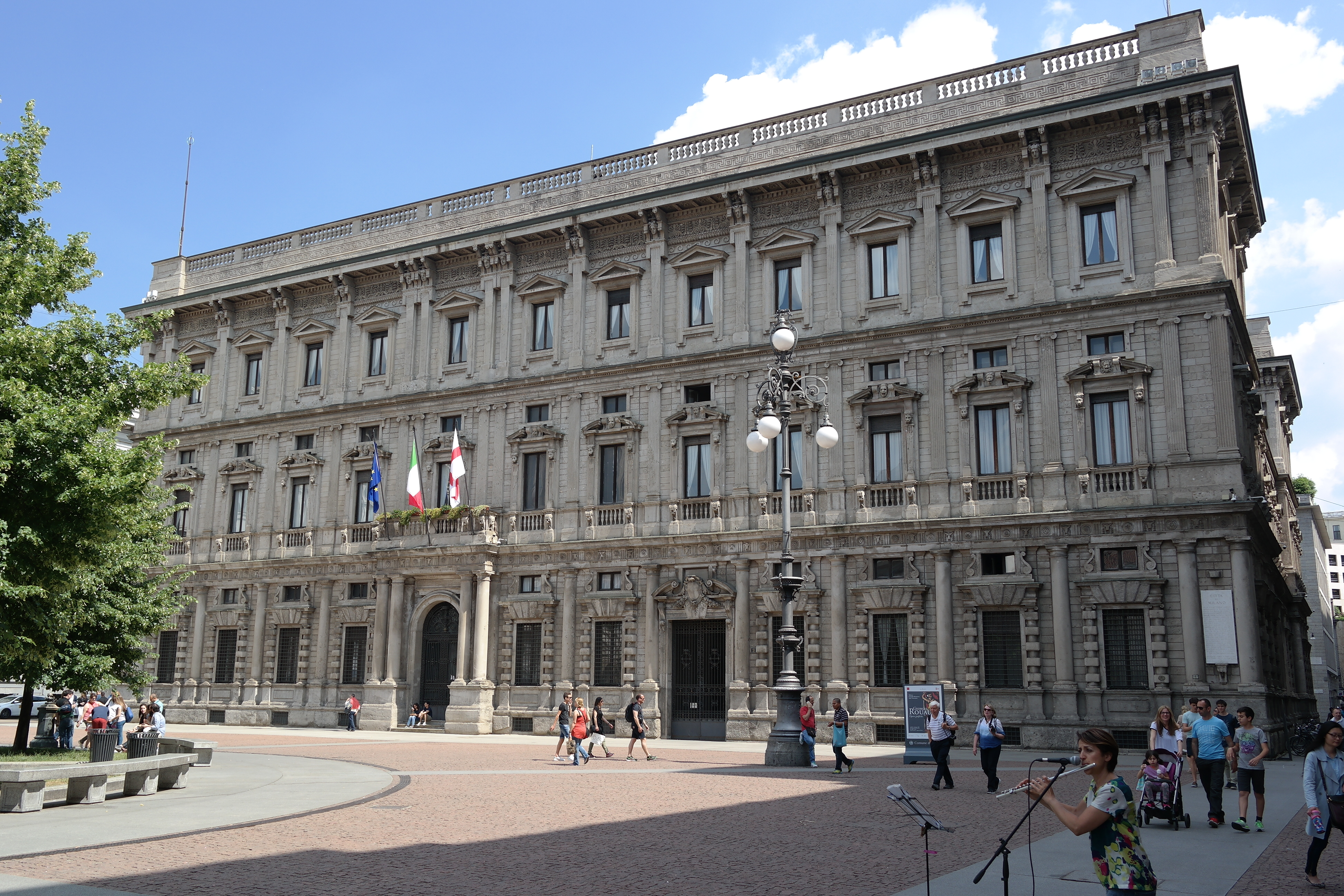
Palazzo Marino, Milan City Hall

The city's nine municipi ("boroughs")

The legislative body of the Italian comuni is the City Council (Consiglio Comunale), which in cities with more than one million population is composed by 48 councillors elected every five years with a proportional system, at the same time of the mayoral elections. The executive body is the City Committee (Giunta Comunale), composed by 12 assessors, that is nominated and presided over by a directly elected Mayor. The current mayor of Milan is Giuseppe Sala, an independent leading a centre-left alliance led by the Democratic Party.

The municipality of Milan is subdivided into nine administrative Borough Councils (Consigli di Municipio), down from the former twenty districts before the 1999 administrative reform. Each Borough Council is governed by a Council (Consiglio) and a President, elected contextually to the city Mayor. The urban organisation is governed by the Italian Constitution (art. 114), the Municipal Statute and several laws, notably the Legislative Decree 267/2000 or Unified Text on Local Administration (Testo Unico degli Enti Locali). After the 2016 administrative reform, the Borough Councils have the power to advise the Mayor with nonbinding opinions on a large spectrum of topics and are responsible for running most local services, such as schools, social services, waste collection, roads, parks, libraries and local commerce; in addition they are supplied with an autonomous funding to finance local activities.

=== Metropolitan city ===
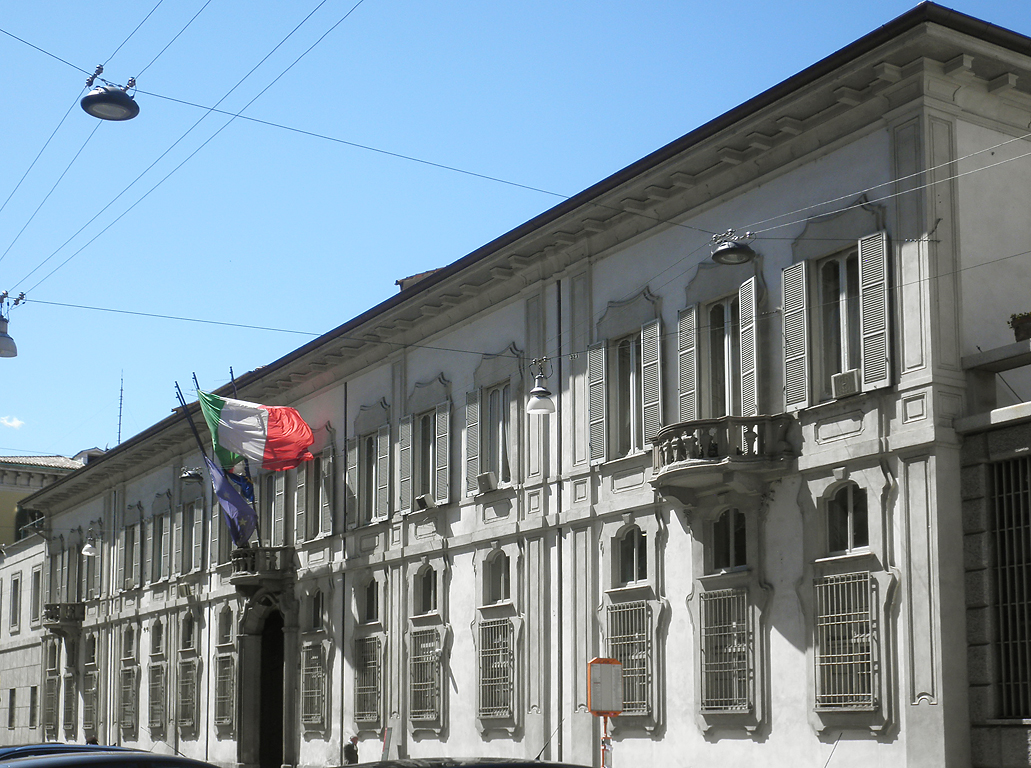
Palazzo Isimbardi is the seat of the Council of the Metropolitan City of Milan.

Milan is the capital of the eponymous Metropolitan city. According to the last governmental dispositions concerning administrative reorganisation, the urban area of Milan is one of the 15 Metropolitan municipalities (città metropolitane), new administrative bodies fully operative since 1 January 2015. The new Metro municipalities, giving large urban areas the administrative powers of a province, are conceived for improving the performance of local administrations and to slash local spending by better co-ordinating the municipalities in providing basic services (including transport, school and social programs) and environment protection. In this policy framework, the Mayor of Milan is designated to exercise the functions of Metropolitan mayor (Sindaco metropolitano), presiding over a Metropolitan Council formed by 24 mayors of municipalities within the Metro municipality. The Metropolitan City of Milan is headed by the Metropolitan Mayor (Sindaco metropolitano) and by the Metropolitan Council (Consiglio metropolitano). Since 21 June 2016, Giuseppe Sala, as mayor of the capital city, has been the mayor of the Metropolitan City.

=== Regional government ===
Milan is also the capital of Lombardy, one of the twenty regions of Italy. Lombardy is by far the most populated region of Italy, with more than ten million inhabitants, almost one sixth of the national total. It is governed by a Regional Council, composed of 80 members elected for a five-year term. On 26 March 2018, a list of candidates of the centre-right coalition, a coalition of centrist and right-wing parties, led by Attilio Fontana, largely won the regional election, defeating a coalition of socialists, liberals and ecologists and a third-party candidate from the populist Five Stars Movement. The conservatives have governed the region almost uninterruptedly since 1970. The regional council has 48 members from the centre-right coalition, 18 from the centre-left coalition and 13 from the Five Star Movement. The seat of the regional government is Palazzo Lombardia that, standing at 161.3 metres (529 feet), is the fifth-tallest building in Milan.

== Cityscape ==
=== Architecture ===
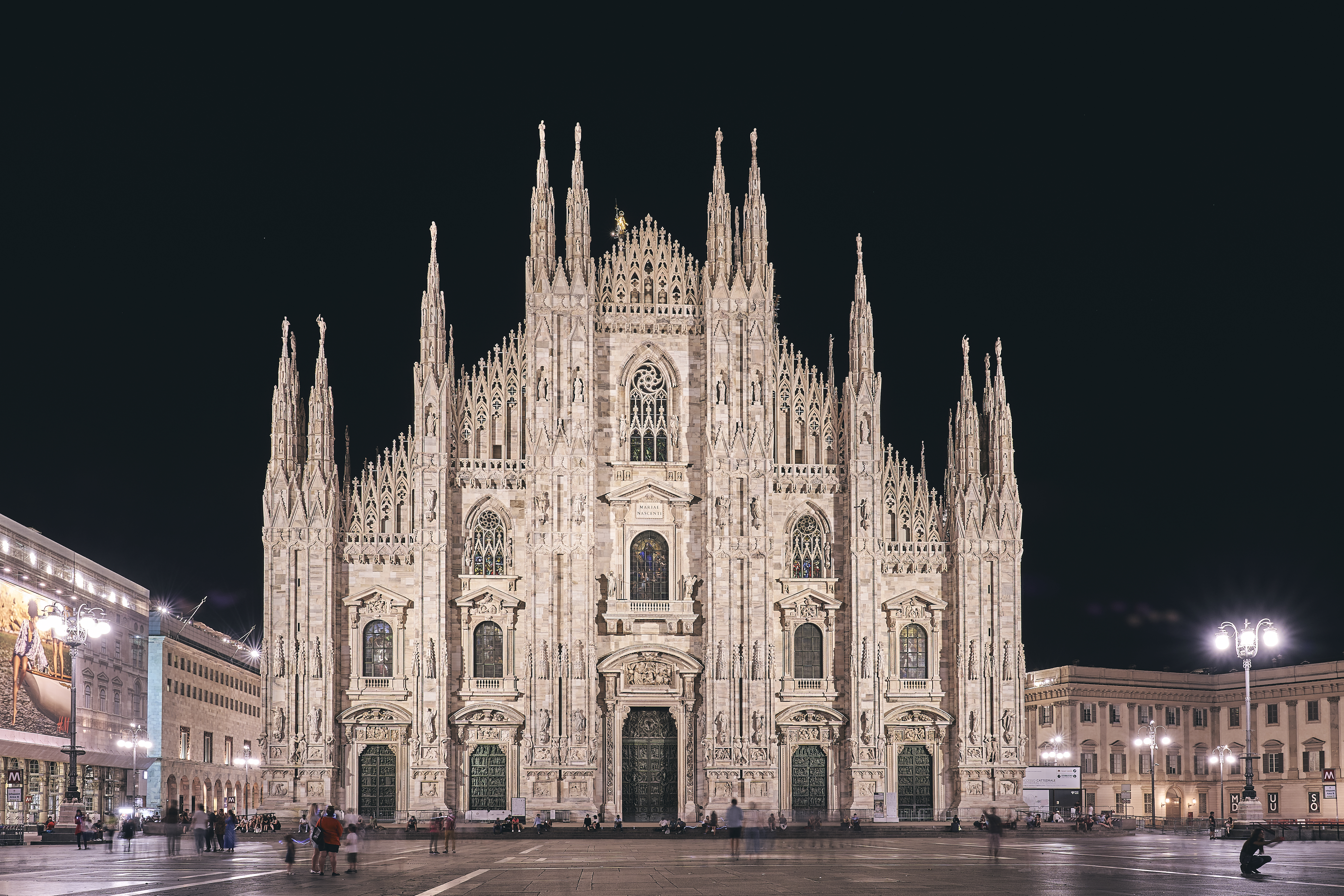
Milan Cathedral is the largest church in Italy—the larger St. Peter's Basilica is in the State of Vatican City, a sovereign state—and the fifth largest in the world.

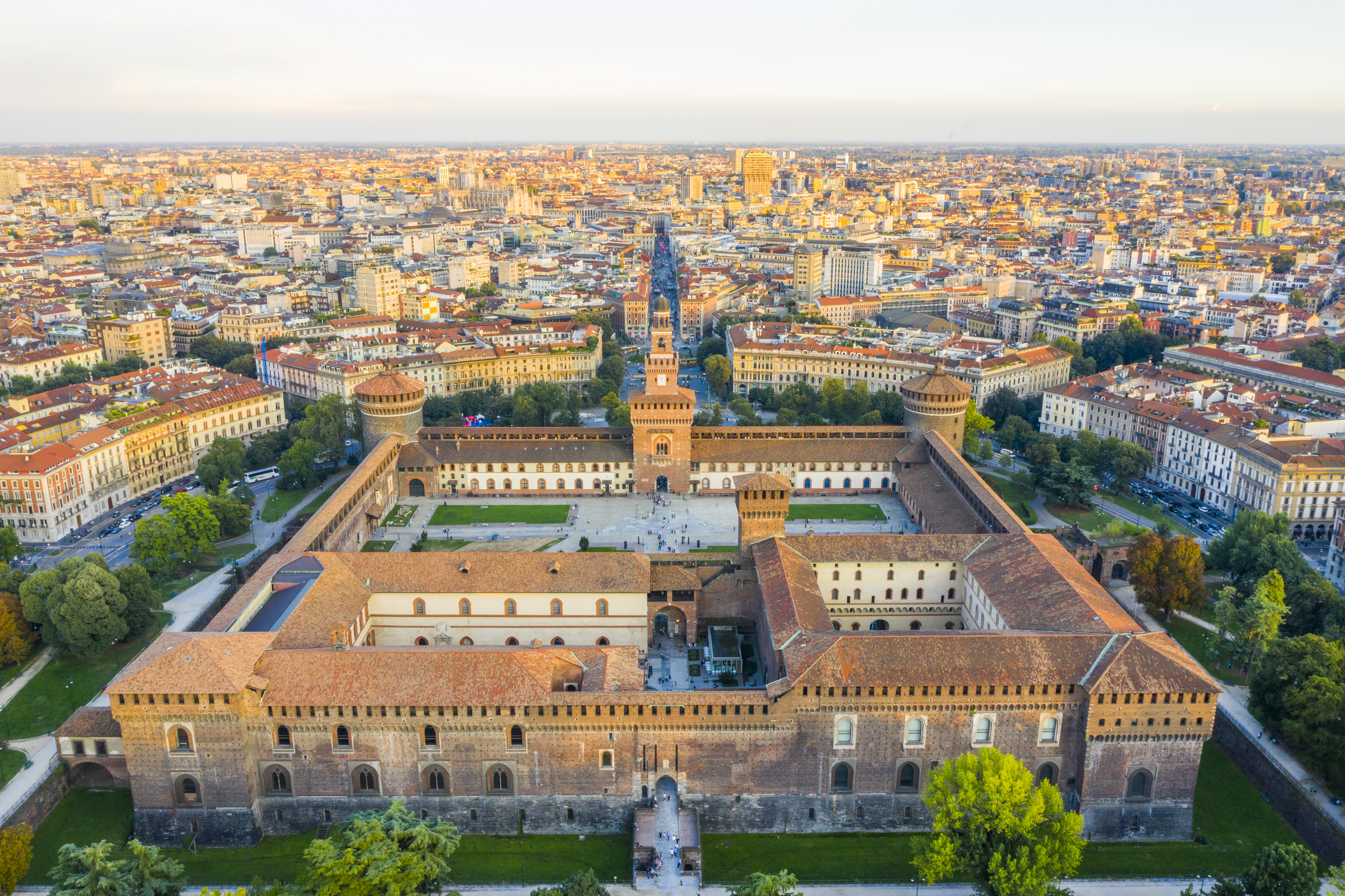
Sforza Castle (Castello Sforzesco), a medieval fortress in Milan

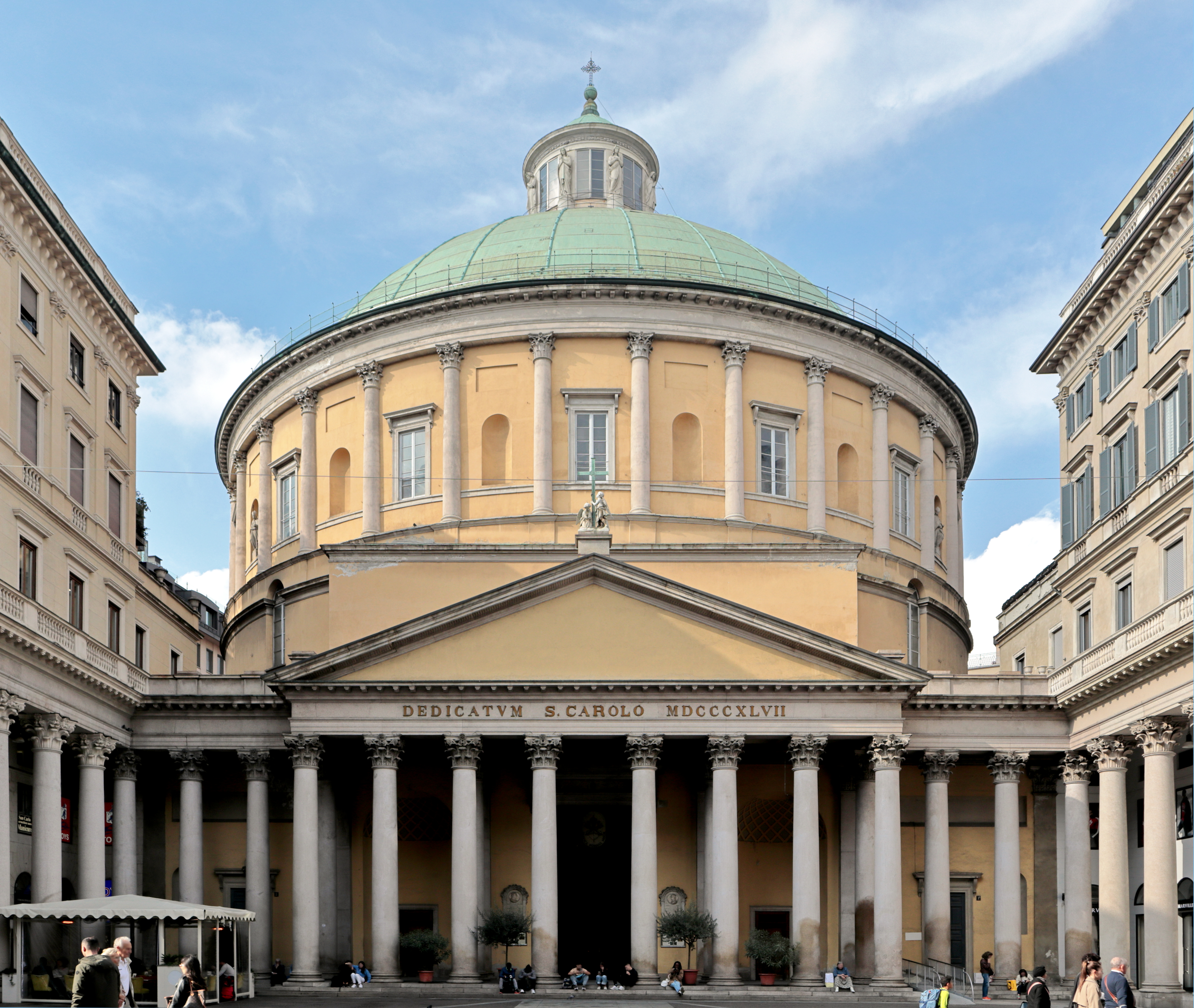
San Carlo al Corso is a fine example of Neoclassical style, inspired by the Roman Pantheon.

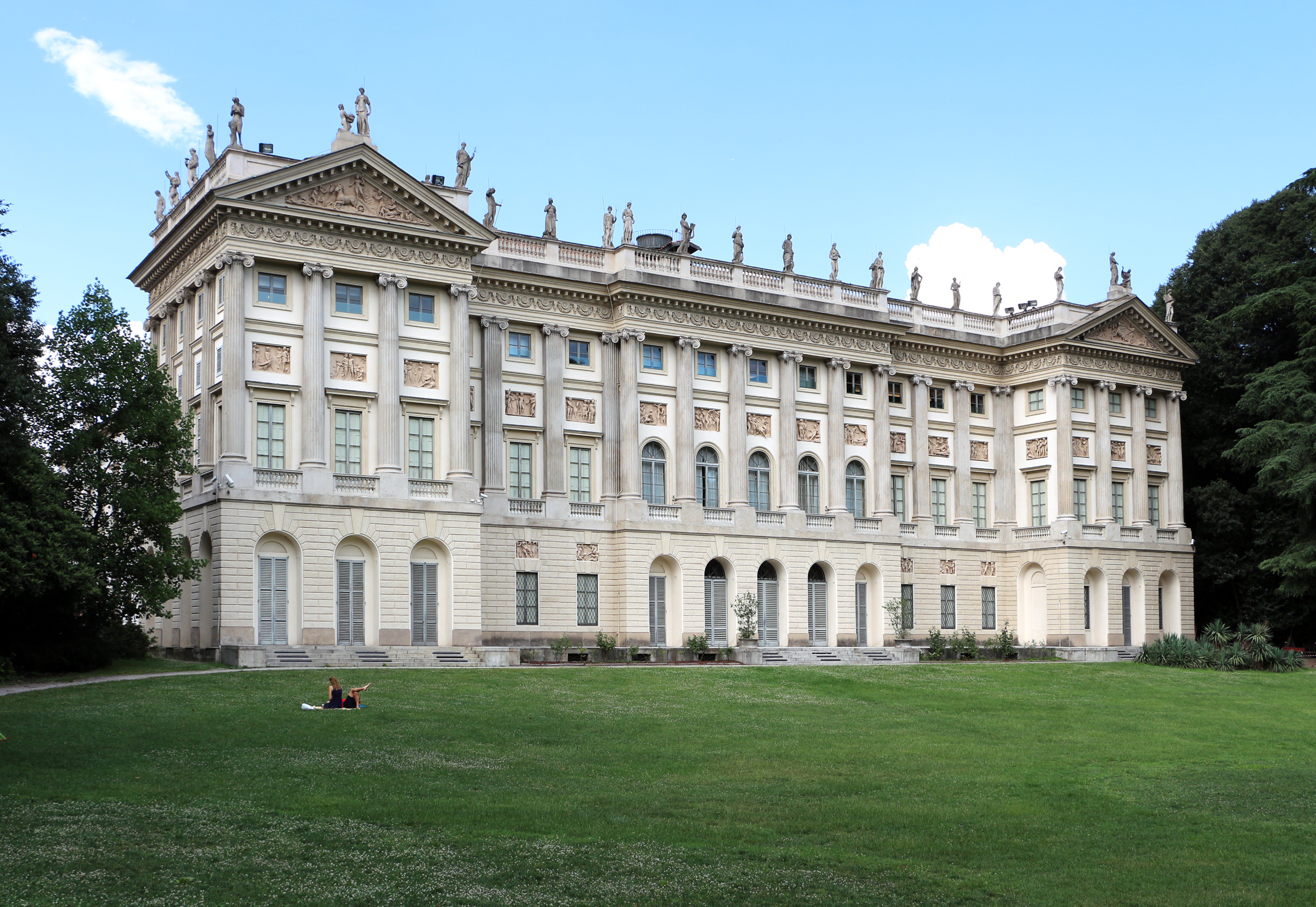
Royal Villa of Milan, one of the finest examples of Neoclassical architecture in Lombardy

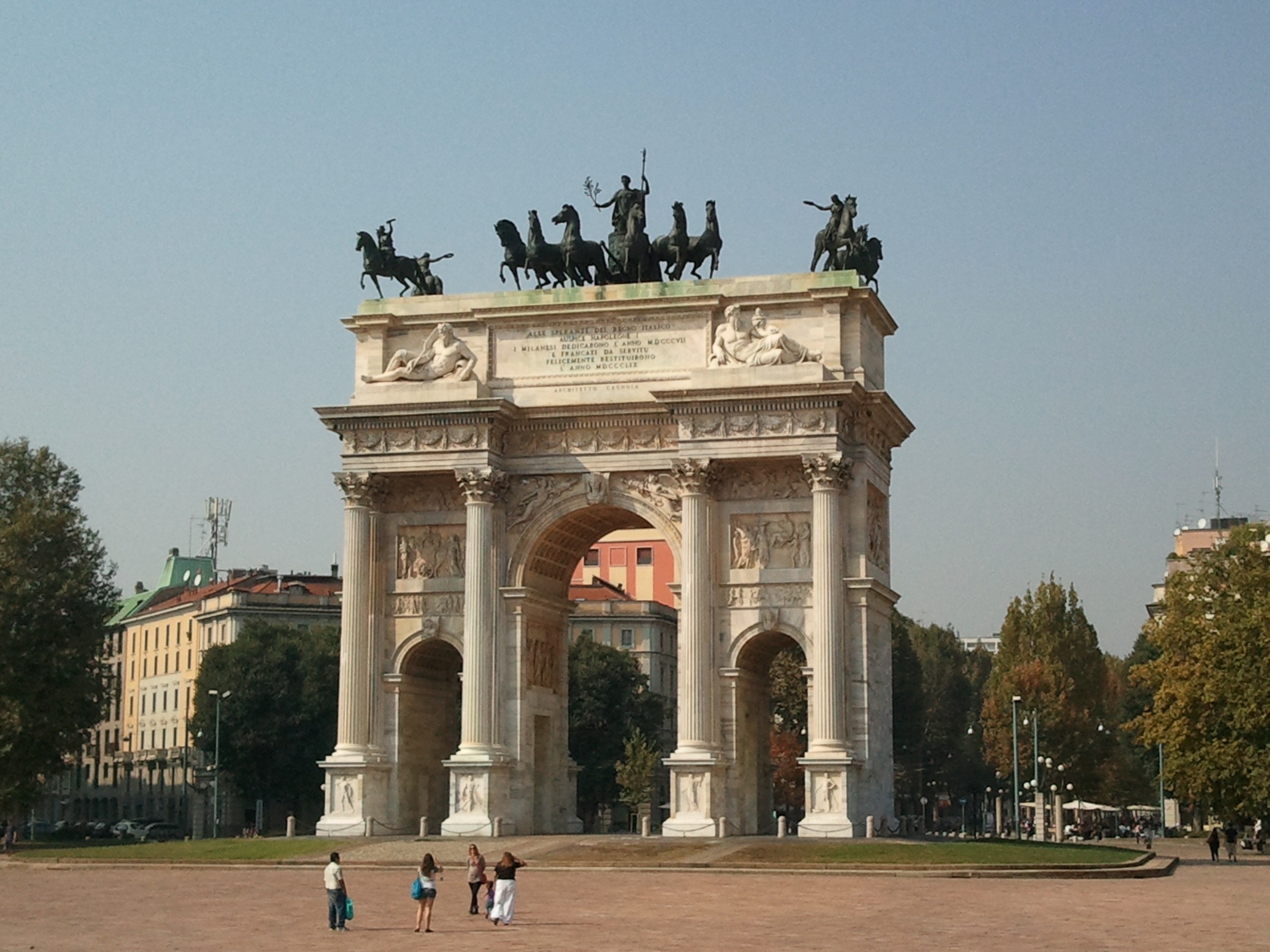
The Arch of Peace dates back to the early 19th century, but its origins can be traced back to a gate of the Roman walls of Milan

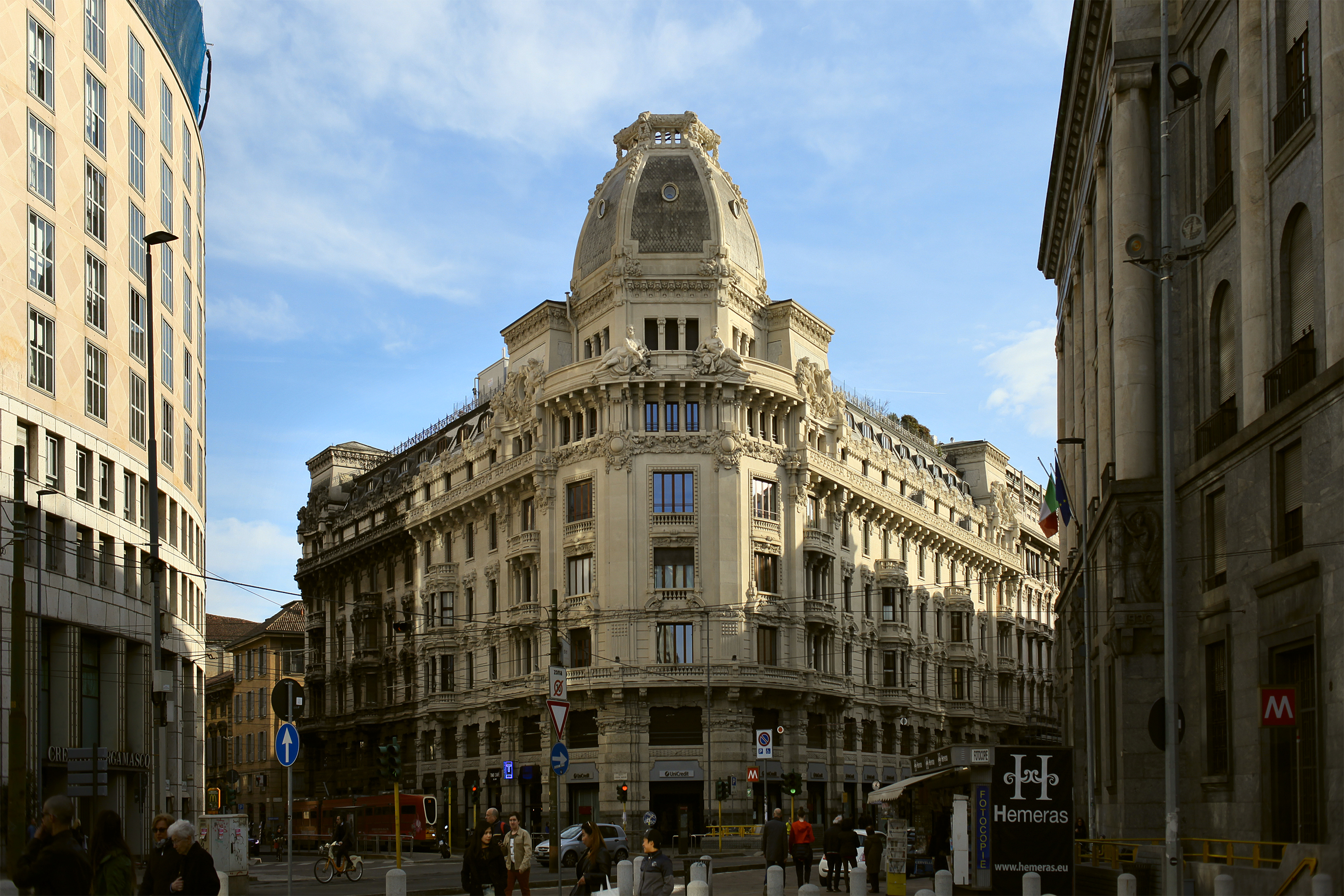
Palazzo Meroni was designed in an eclectic style with strong Art Nouveau and Beaux-Arts influences

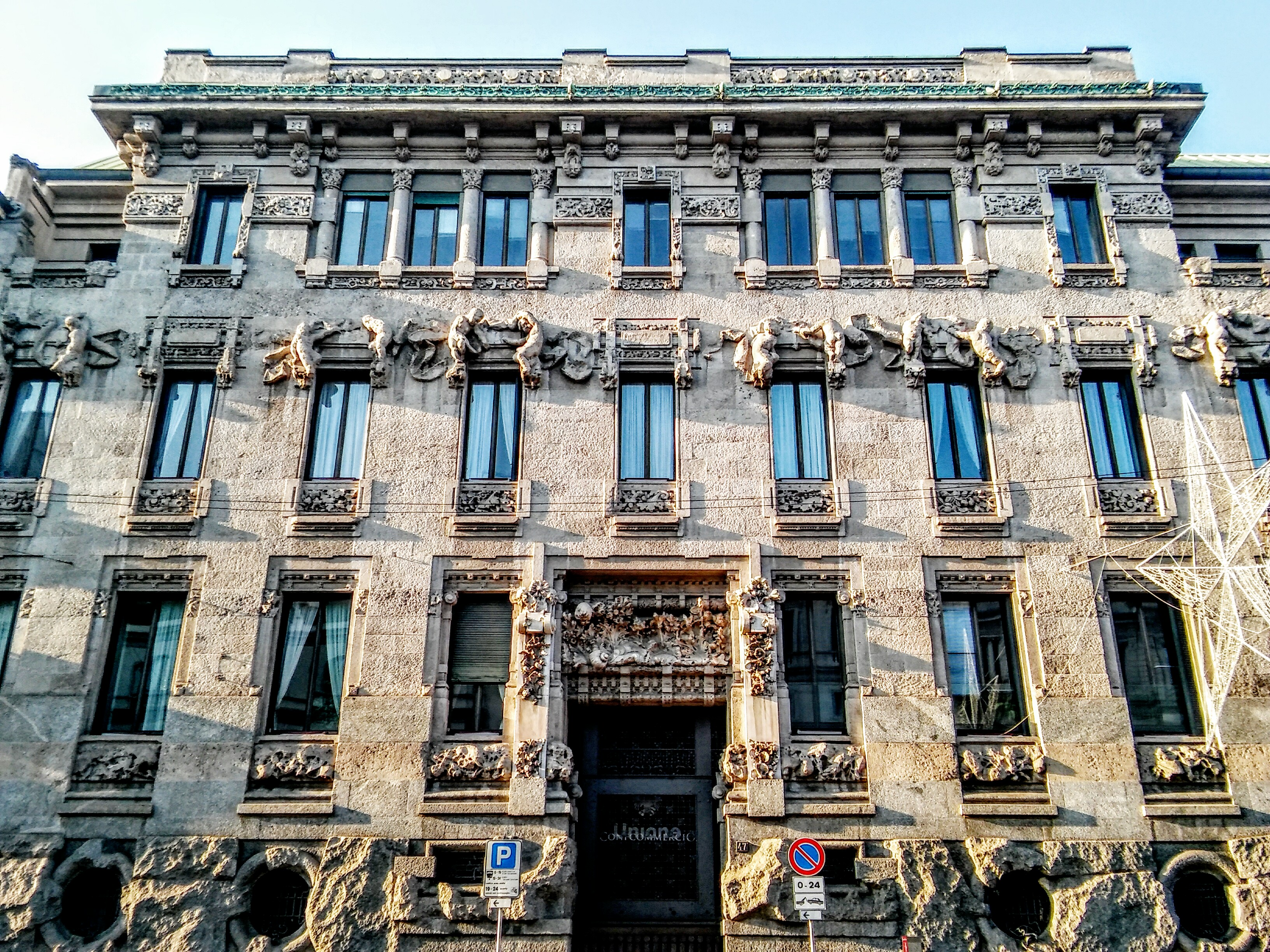
Palazzo Castiglioni, designed in the Liberty style, on Corso Venezia

The architectural and artistic presence in Milan represents one of the attractions of the Lombard capital. Milan has been among the most important Italian centers in the history of architecture, has made important contributions to the development of art history, and has been the cradle of a number of modern art movements.

There are only few remains of the ancient Roman city, notably the well-preserved Colonne di San Lorenzo. During the second half of the 4th century, Saint Ambrose, as bishop of Milan, had a strong influence on the layout of the city, reshaping the centre (although the cathedral and baptistery built in Roman times are now lost) and building the great basilicas at the city gates: Sant'Ambrogio, San Nazaro in Brolo, San Simpliciano and Sant'Eustorgio, which still stand, refurbished over the centuries, as some of the finest and most important churches in Milan. Milan's Cathedral, built between 1386 and 1877, is the largest church in Italy—the larger St. Peter's Basilica is in the State of Vatican City, a sovereign state—and the third largest in the world, as well as the most important example of Gothic architecture in Italy. The gilt bronze statue of the Virgin Mary, placed in 1774 on the highest pinnacle of the Duomo, soon became one of the most enduring symbols of Milan.

In the 15th century, when the Sforza ruled the city, an old Viscontean fortress was enlarged and embellished to become the Castello Sforzesco, the seat of an elegant Renaissance court surrounded by a walled hunting park. Notable architects involved in the project included the Florentine Filarete, who was commissioned to build the high central entrance tower, and the military specialist Bartolomeo Gadio. The alliance between Francesco Sforza and Florence's Cosimo de' Medici bore to Milan Tuscan models of Renaissance architecture, apparent in the Ospedale Maggiore and Bramante's work in the city, which includes Santa Maria presso San Satiro (a reconstruction of a small 9th-century church), the tribune of Santa Maria delle Grazie and three cloisters for Sant'Ambrogio. The Counter-Reformation in the 16th to 17th centuries was also the period of Spanish domination and was marked by two powerful figures: Saint Charles Borromeo and his cousin, Cardinal Federico Borromeo. Not only did they impose themselves as moral guides to the people of Milan, but they also gave a great impulse to culture, with the creation of the Biblioteca Ambrosiana, in a building designed by Francesco Maria Richini, and the nearby Pinacoteca Ambrosiana. Many notable churches and Baroque mansions were built in the city during this period by the architects Pellegrino Tibaldi, Galeazzo Alessi and Richini himself. Empress Maria Theresa of Austria was responsible for the significant renovations carried out in Milan during the 18th century. This urban and artistic renewal included the establishment of Teatro alla Scala, inaugurated in 1778, and the renovation of the Royal Palace. The late 1700s Palazzo Belgioioso by Giuseppe Piermarini and Royal Villa of Milan by Leopoldo Pollack, later the official residence of Austrian viceroys, are often regarded among the best examples of Neoclassical architecture in Lombardy. From 1805 to 1814, during the Napoleonic rule of the city, Milan was established as the capital of a satellite Kingdom of Italy and steps were taken to reshape it in accordince with its newly acquired status. This included construction of large boulevards, new squares (Porta Ticinese by Luigi Cagnola and Foro Bonaparte by Giovanni Antonio Antolini), and cultural institutions (Art Gallery and the Academy of Fine Arts). The massive Arch of Peace, situated at the bottom of Corso Sempione, is often compared to the Arc de Triomphe in Paris. In the second half of the 19th century, Milan quickly became the main industrial centre of the new Italian nation, drawing inspiration from the great European capitals that were hubs of the Second Industrial Revolution. The great Galleria Vittorio Emanuele II, realised by Giuseppe Mengoni between 1865 and 1877 to celebrate Vittorio Emanuele II, is a covered passage with a glass and cast iron roof, inspired by the Burlington Arcade in London. Several other arcades such as the Galleria del Corso, built between 1923 and 1931, complement it. Another late-19th-century eclectic monument in the city is the Cimitero Monumentale graveyard, built in a Neo-Romanesque style between 1863 and 1866.

The tumultuous period of early 20th century brought several, radical innovations in Milanese architecture. Art Nouveau, also known as Liberty in Italy, is recognisable in Palazzo Castiglioni, built by architect Giuseppe Sommaruga between 1901 and 1903. Other examples include Hotel Corso, Casa Guazzoni with its wrought iron and staircase, and Berri-Meregalli house, the latter built in a traditional Milanese Art Nouveau style combined with elements of neo-Romanesque and Gothic revival architecture, regarded as one of the last such types of architecture in the city. A new, more eclectic form of architecture can be seen in buildings such as Castello Cova, built the 1910s in a distinctly neo-medieval style, evoking the architectural trends of the past. An important example of Art Deco, which blended such styles with Fascist architecture, is the huge Central railway station inaugurated in 1931.

The post-World War II period saw rapid reconstruction and fast economic growth, accompanied by a nearly two-fold increase in population. In the 1950s and 1960s, a strong demand for new residential and commercial areas drove to extreme urban expansion, that has produced some of the major milestones in the city's architectural history, including Gio Ponti's Pirelli Tower (1956–60), Velasca Tower (1956–58), and the creation of brand new residential satellite towns, as well as huge amounts of low-quality public housings. In recent years, de-industrialization, urban decay and gentrification led to a vast urban renewal of former industrial areas, that have been transformed into modern residential and financial districts, notably Porta Nuova in downtown Milan and FieraMilano in the suburb of Rho. In addition, the old exhibition area is being completely reshaped according to the Citylife regeneration project, featuring residencial areas, museums, an urban park and three skyscrapers designed by international architects, and after whom they are named: the 202-metre (663-foot) Isozaki Arata (when completed, the tallest building in Italy), the twisted Hadid Tower, and the curved Libeskind Tower.

Two business districts dominate Milan's skyline: Porta Nuova in the north-east (boroughs No. 9 and 2) and CityLife (borough No. 8) in the north-west part of the commune. The tallest buildings include the Unicredit Tower at 231 m (though only 162 m without the spire), and the 209 m Allianz Tower, a 50-story tower.

=== Parks and gardens ===
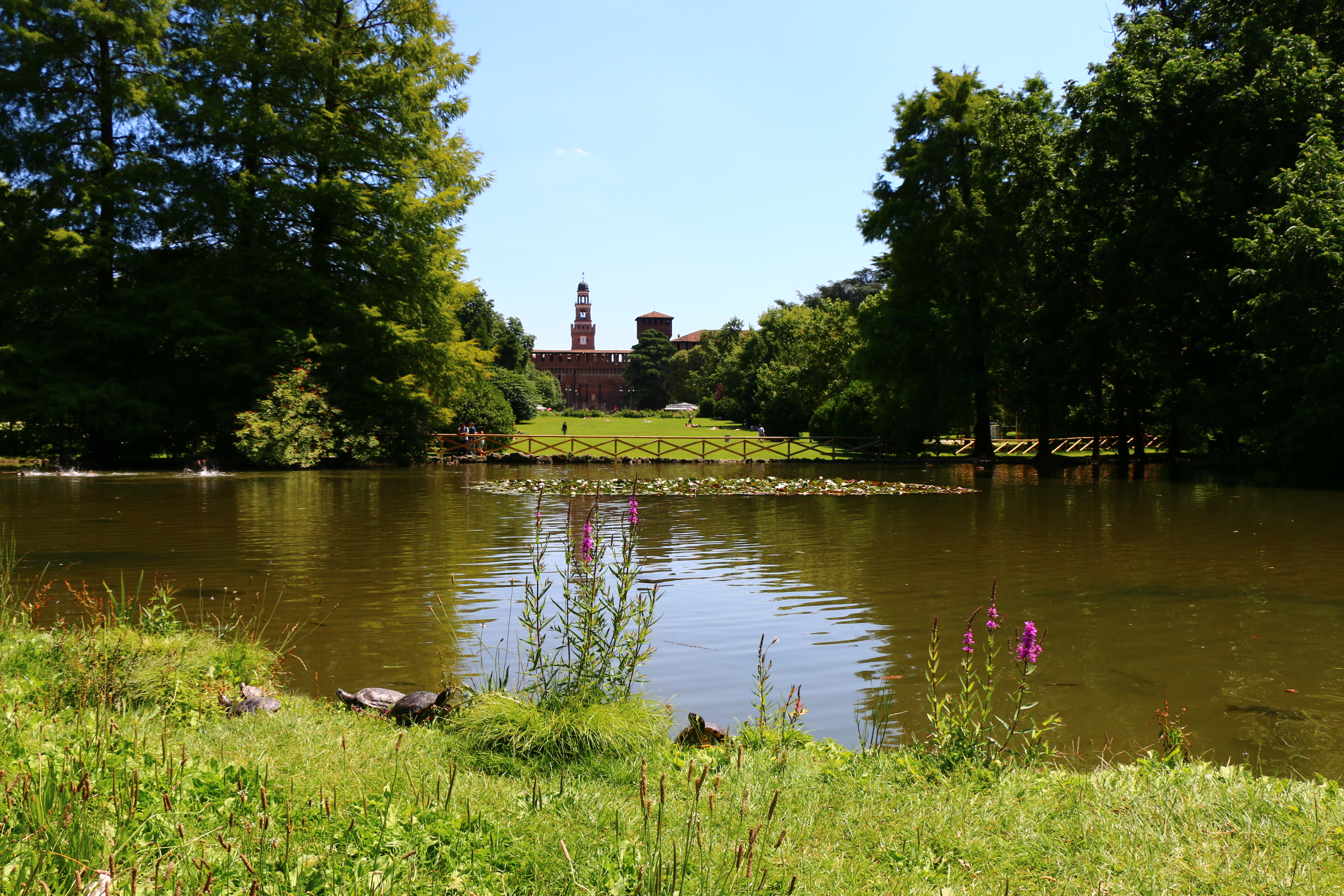
Sempione Park

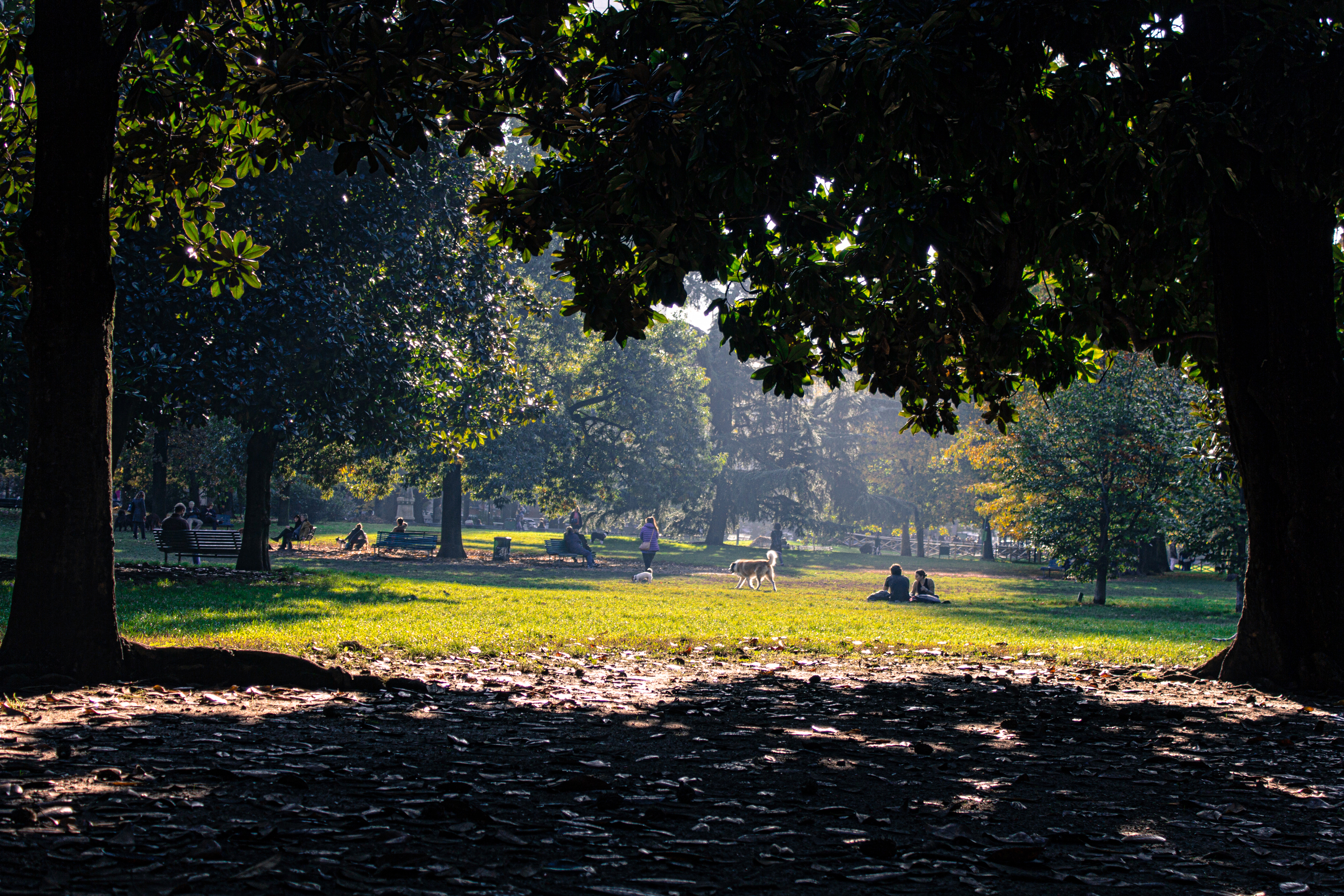
Montanelli Gardens

The largest parks in the central area of Milan are Sempione Park, at the north-western edge, and Montanelli Gardens, situated north-east of the city. English-style Sempione Park, built in 1890, contains the Civic Arena, the Civic Aquarium of Milan (which is the third oldest aquarium in Europe), a steel lattice panoramic tower, an art exhibition centre, a Japanese garden and a public library. The Montanelli gardens, created in the 18th century, hosts the Natural History Museum of Milan and a planetarium. Slightly away from the city centre, heading east, Forlanini Park is characterised by a large pond and a few preserved shacks which remind of the area's agricultural past. In recent years Milan's authorities pledged to develop its green areas: they planned to create twenty new urban parks and extend the already existing ones, and announced plans to plant three million trees by 2030.

Also notable is Monte Stella ("Starmount"), also informally called Montagnetta di San Siro ("Little mountain of San Siro"), an artificial hill and surrounding city park in Milan. The hill was created using the debris from the buildings that were bombed during World War II, as well as from the last remnants of the Spanish walls of the city, demolished in the mid 20th century. Even at only 25 m (82 ft) height, the hill provides a panoramic view of the city and hinterland, and in a clear day, the Alps and Apennines can be distinguished from atop. A notable area of the park is called "Giardino dei Giusti" (Garden of the Just), which is a memorial to distinguished opponents of genocide and crimes against humanity; each tree in the garden is dedicated to one such person. Notable people who have been dedicated a tree in the Giardino dei Giusti include Moshe Bejski, Andrej Sakharov, Svetlana Broz, and Pietro Kuciukian.

The Orto Botanico di Brera a botanical garden located behind Palazzo Brera at Via Brera 28 in the center of Milan, is another major park in the city. The garden consists primarily of rectangular flower-beds, trimmed in brick, with elliptical ponds from the 18th century, and specula and greenhouse from the 19th century (now used by the Academy of Fine Arts). It contains one of the oldest Ginkgo biloba trees in Europe, as well as mature specimens of Firmiana platanifolia, Juglans nigra, Pterocarya fraxinifolia, and Tilia.

In addition, even though Milan is located in one of the most urbanised regions of Italy, it is surrounded by a belt of green areas and features numerous gardens even in its very centre. The farmlands and woodlands north (Parco Nord Milano since 1975) and south (Parco Agricolo Sud Milano since 1990) of the urban area have been protected as regional parks. West of the city, the Parco delle Cave (Sand pit park) has been established on a neglected site where gravel and sand used to be extracted, featuring artificial lakes and woods.

== Culture ==
=== Museums and art galleries ===
Leonardo da Vinci's The Last Supper, together with the church of Santa Maria delle Grazie, is a UNESCO World Heritage Site.

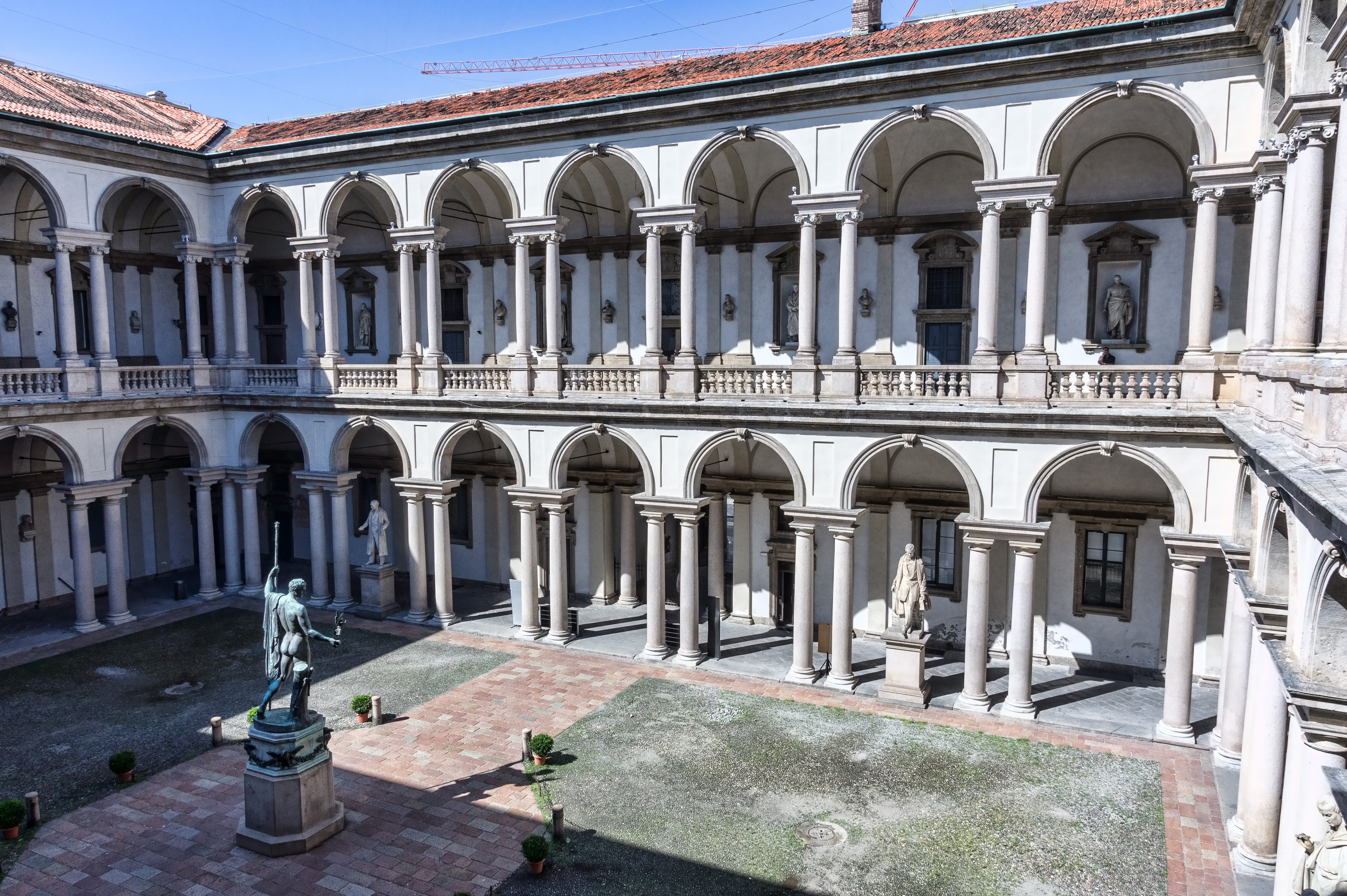
Pinacoteca di Brera is the city's largest art gallery.

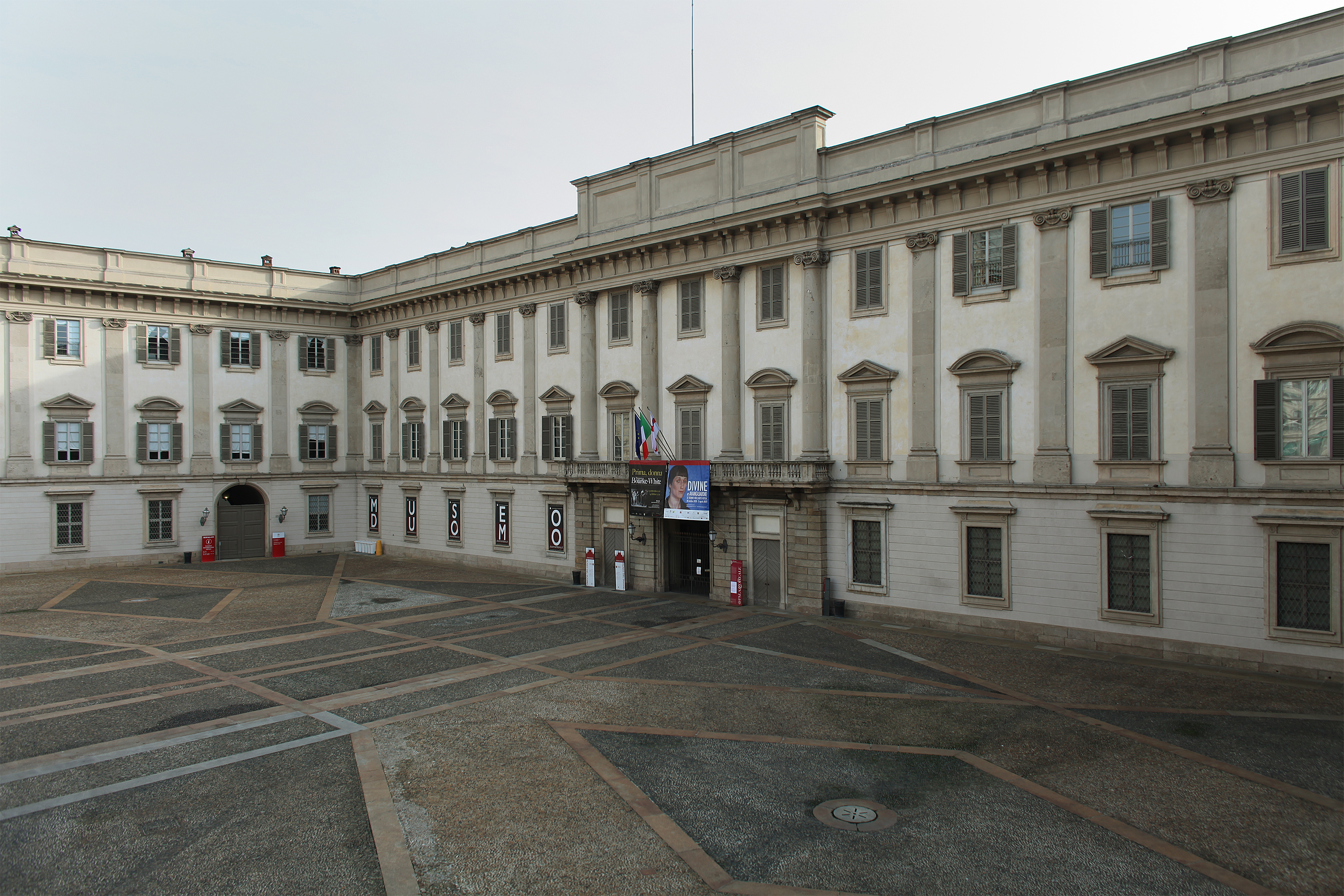
The Royal Palace of Milan is a major venue for international art exhibitions.

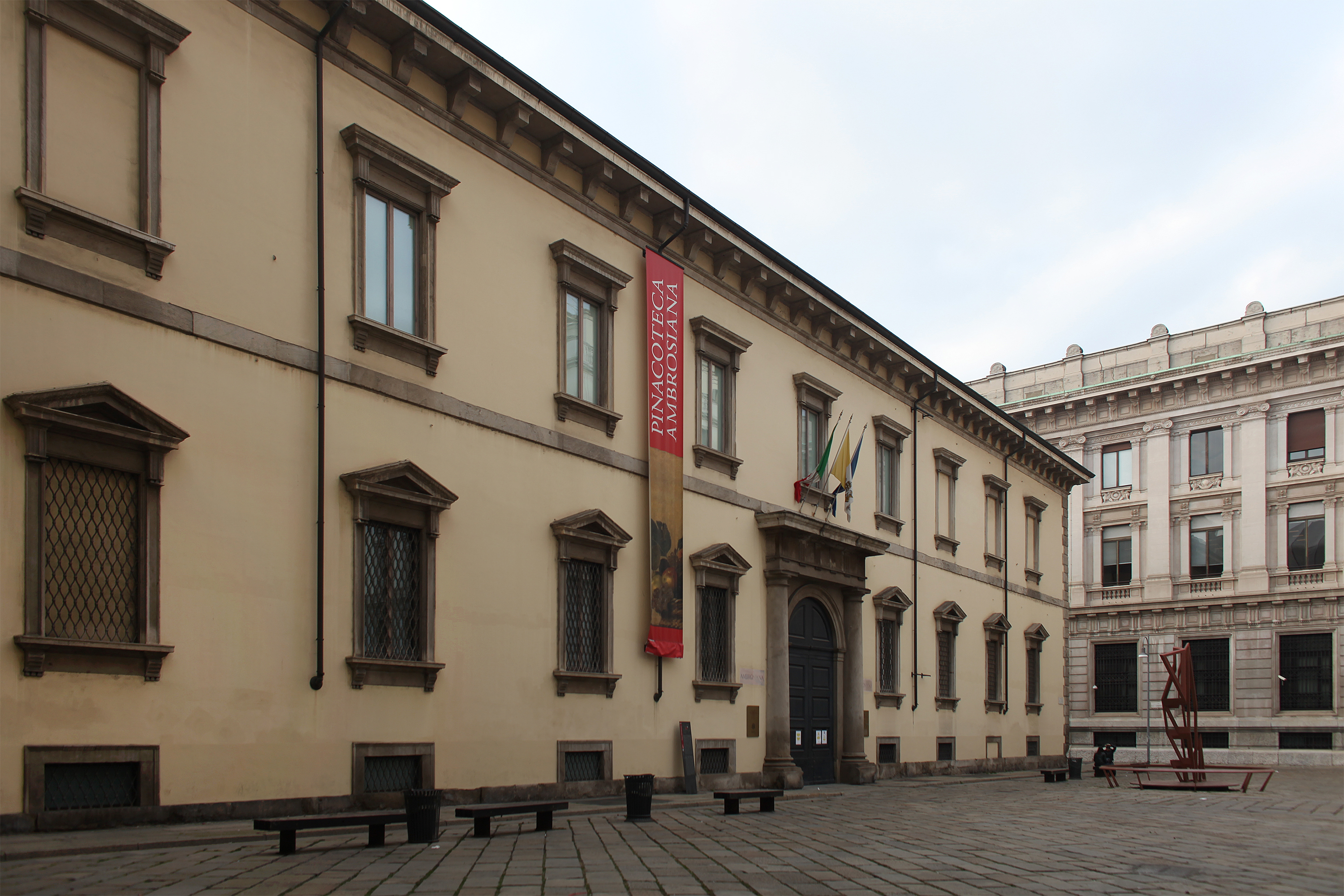
The Biblioteca Ambrosiana and Pinacoteca Ambrosiana are among the city's most important libraries and art galleries, with a large collection of historic books, manuscripts, sketches and paintings from the Renaissance.

Milan is home to many cultural institutions, museums and art galleries, that account for about a tenth of the national total of visitors and receipts. The Pinacoteca di Brera is one of Milan's most important art galleries. It contains one of the foremost collections of Italian painting, including masterpieces such as the Brera Madonna by Piero della Francesca. The Castello Sforzesco hosts numerous art collections and exhibitions, especially statues, ancient arms and furnitures, as well as the Pinacoteca del Castello Sforzesco, with an art collection including Michelangelo's last sculpture, the Rondanini Pietà, Andrea Mantegna's Trivulzio Madonna and Leonardo da Vinci's Codex Trivulzianus manuscript. The Castello complex also includes The Museum of Ancient Art, The Furniture Museum, The Museum of Musical Instruments and the Applied Arts Collection, The Egyptian and Prehistoric sections of the Archaeological Museum and the Achille Bertarelli Print Collection (Civica Raccolta delle Stampe Bertarelli).

Milan's figurative art flourished in the Middle Ages, and with the Visconti family being major patrons of the arts, the city became an important centre of Gothic art and architecture (Milan Cathedral being the city's most formidable work of Gothic architecture). Leonardo worked in Milan from 1482 until 1499. He was commissioned to paint the Virgin of the Rocks for the Confraternity of the Immaculate Conception and The Last Supper for the monastery of Santa Maria delle Grazie.

The city was affected by the Baroque in the 17th and 18th centuries, and hosted numerous formidable artists, architects and painters of that period, such as Caravaggio and Francesco Hayez, which several important works are hosted in Brera Academy. The Museum of Risorgimento is specialised on the history of Italian unification Its collections include iconic paintings like Baldassare Verazzi's Episode from the Five Days and Francesco Hayez's 1840 Portrait of Emperor Ferdinand I of Austria. The Triennale is a design museum and events venue located in Palazzo dell'Arte, in Sempione Park. It hosts exhibitions and events highlighting contemporary Italian design, urban planning, architecture, music and media arts, emphasising the relationship between art and industry.

Milan in the 20th century was the epicentre of the futurist artistic movement. Filippo Marinetti, the founder of Italian Futurism wrote in his 1909 "Manifesto of Futurism" (in Italian, Manifesto Futuristico), that Milan was "grande...tradizionale e futurista" ("grand...traditional and futuristic", in English). Umberto Boccioni was also an important Futurism artist who worked in the city. Today, Milan remains a major international hub of modern and contemporary art, with numerous modern art galleries. The Modern Art Gallery, situated in the Royal Villa, hosts collections of Italian and European painting from the 18th to the early 20th centuries. The Museo del Novecento, situated in the Palazzo dell'Arengario, is one of the most important art galleries in Italy about 20th-century art; of particular relevance are the sections dedicated to Futurism, Spatialism and Arte povera. In the early 1990s architect David Chipperfield was invited to convert the premises of the former Ansaldo Factory into a Museum. Museo delle Culture (MUDEC) opened in April 2015. The Gallerie di Piazza Scala, a modern and contemporary museum located in Piazza della Scala in the Palazzo Brentani and the Palazzo Anguissola, hosts 195 artworks from the collections of Fondazione Cariplo with a strong representation of nineteenth-century Lombard painters and sculptors, including Antonio Canova and Umberto Boccioni. A new section was opened in the Palazzo della Banca Commerciale Italiana in 2012. Other private ventures dedicated to contemporary art include the exhibiting spaces of the Prada Foundation and HangarBicocca. The Nicola Trussardi Foundation is renewed for organising temporary exhibition in venues around the city. Milan is also home to many public art projects, with a variety of works that range from sculptures to murals to pieces by internationally renowned artists, including Arman, Kengiro Azuma, Francesco Barzaghi, Alberto Burri, Pietro Cascella, Maurizio Cattelan, Leonardo da Vinci, Giorgio de Chirico, Kris Ruhs, Emilio Isgrò, Fausto Melotti, Joan Miró, Carlo Mo, Claes Oldenburg, Igor Mitoraj, Gianfranco Pardi, Michelangelo Pistoletto, Arnaldo Pomodoro, Carlo Ramous, Aldo Rossi, Aligi Sassu, Giuseppe Spagnulo and Domenico Trentacoste.

=== Music ===
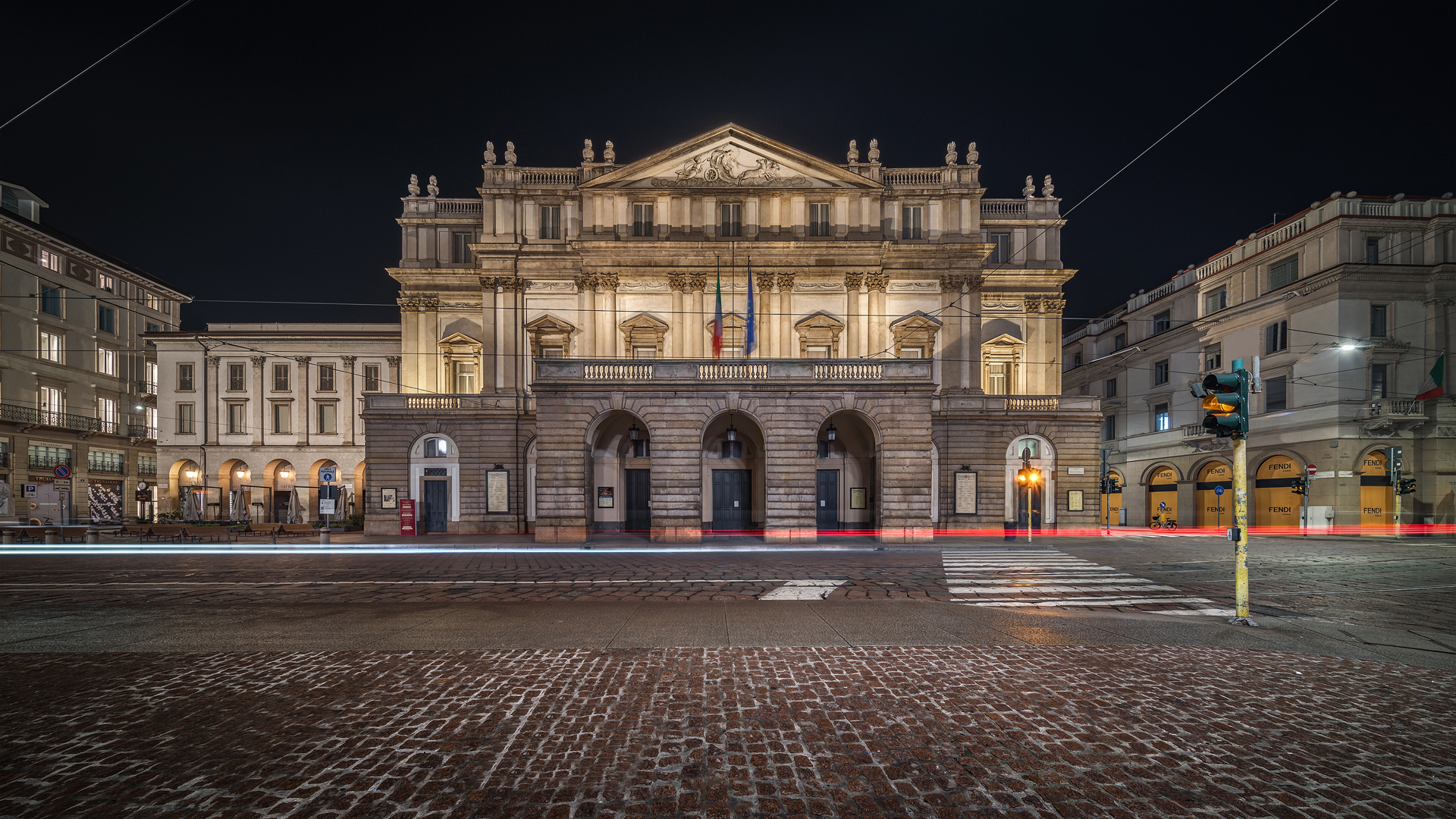
Inaugurated in 1778, La Scala is among the world's most famous opera houses.

Milan is considered an international capital of the performing arts. The city hosts La Scala opera house, widely considered one of the world's most prestigious, with a 200-year history of premieres of major operas, such as Nabucco by Giuseppe Verdi in 1842, La Gioconda by Amilcare Ponchielli, Madama Butterfly by Giacomo Puccini in 1904, Turandot by Puccini in 1926, and more recently Teneke, by Fabio Vacchi in 2007. Other relevant theatres in Milan include Teatro degli Arcimboldi, Teatro Dal Verme, Teatro Lirico. The city is also the seat of a renowned symphony orchestra and musical conservatory, and has been, throughout history, a major centre for musical composition: numerous famous composers and musicians such as Gioseppe Caimo, Simon Boyleau, Hoste da Reggio, Giuseppe Verdi, Giulio Gatti-Casazza, Paolo Cherici and Alice Edun lived and worked in Milan. The city is also the birthplace of many modern ensembles and bands, including I Camaleonti, Camerata Mediolanense, Gli Spioni, Dynamis Ensemble, Elio e le Storie Tese, Krisma, Premiata Forneria Marconi, Quartetto Cetra, Stormy Six, Le Vibrazioni and Lacuna Coil.

=== Fashion and design ===
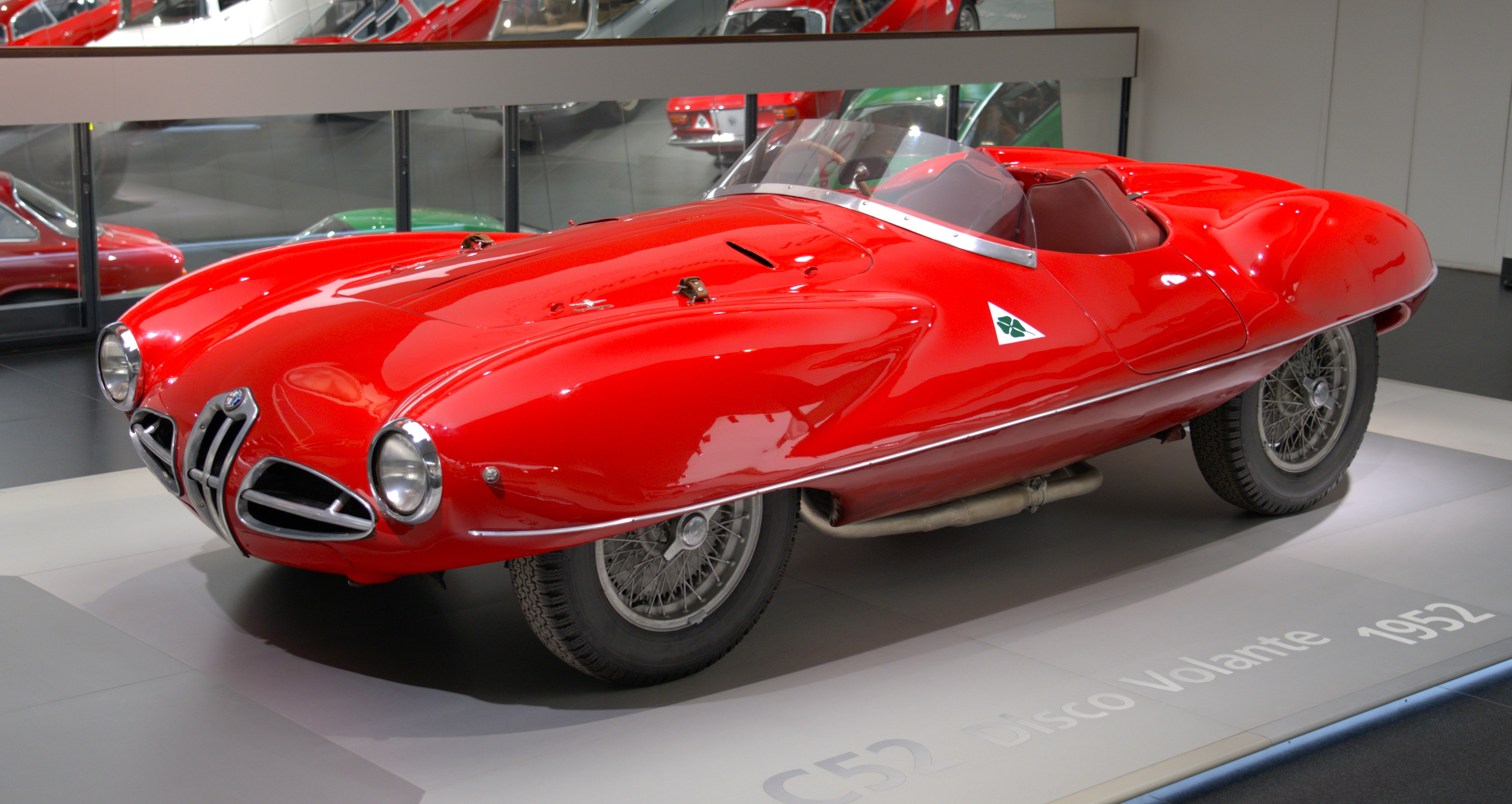
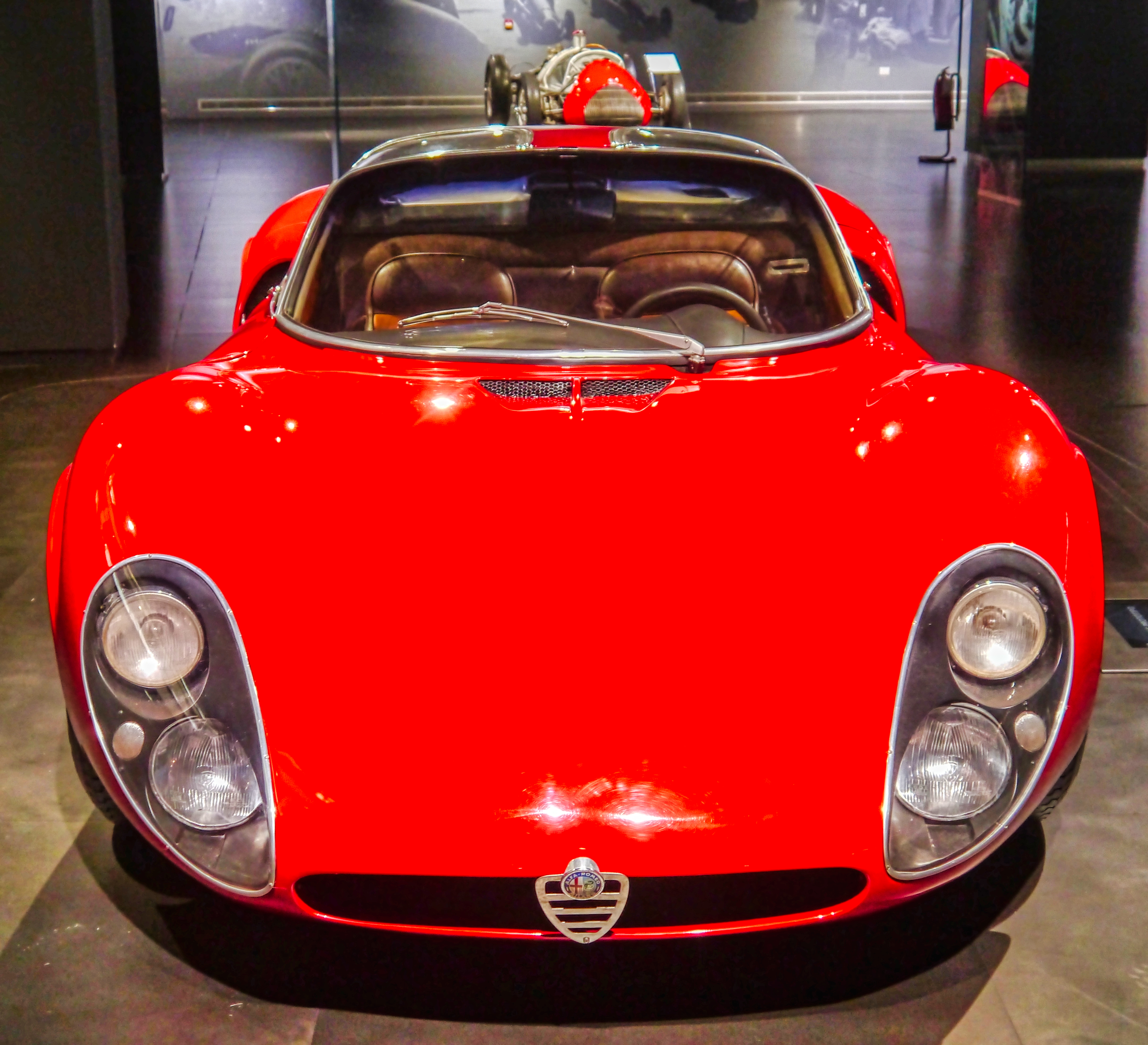
A 1952 Alfa Romeo 1900 C52 Disco Volante (left) and a 1967 Alfa Romeo 33 Stradale (right) at the Museum of Alfa Romeo, established in Milan in 1910. The company's logo features the flag of Milan and the Biscione, a symbol of the city, originally on the coat-of-arms of the Visconti and Sforza dynasties.

Milan is widely regarded as a global capital in industrial design, fashion and architecture. In the 1950s and 60s, as the main industrial centre of Italy and one of Europe's most dynamic cities, Milan became a world capital of design and architecture. There was such a revolutionary change that Milan's fashion exports accounted for US$726 million in 1952, and by 1955 that number grew to US$72.5 billion.

Modern skyscrapers, such as the Pirelli Tower and the Torre Velasca were built, and artists such as Bruno Munari, Lucio Fontana, Enrico Castellani and Piero Manzoni gathered in the city. Today, Milan is still particularly well known for its high-quality furniture and interior design industry. The city is home to Fiera Milano, Europe's largest permanent trade exhibition, and Salone Internazionale del Mobile, one of the most prestigious international furniture and design fairs.

Milan is also regarded as one of the fashion capitals of the world, along with New York City, Paris and London. Milan is synonymous with the Italian prêt-à-porter industry, as many of the most famous Italian fashion brands, such as Valentino, Versace, Prada, Armani and Dolce & Gabbana, are headquartered in the city. Numerous international fashion labels also operate shops in Milan. Furthermore, the city hosts the Milan Fashion Week twice a year, one of the most important events in the international fashion system. Milan's main upscale fashion district, quadrilatero della moda, is home to the city's most prestigious shopping streets (Via Monte Napoleone, Via della Spiga, Via Sant'Andrea, Via Manzoni and Corso Venezia), in addition to Galleria Vittorio Emanuele II, one of the world's oldest shopping malls. The term sciura encapsulates the look and culture of fashionable, elderly Milanese women.

=== Languages and literature ===
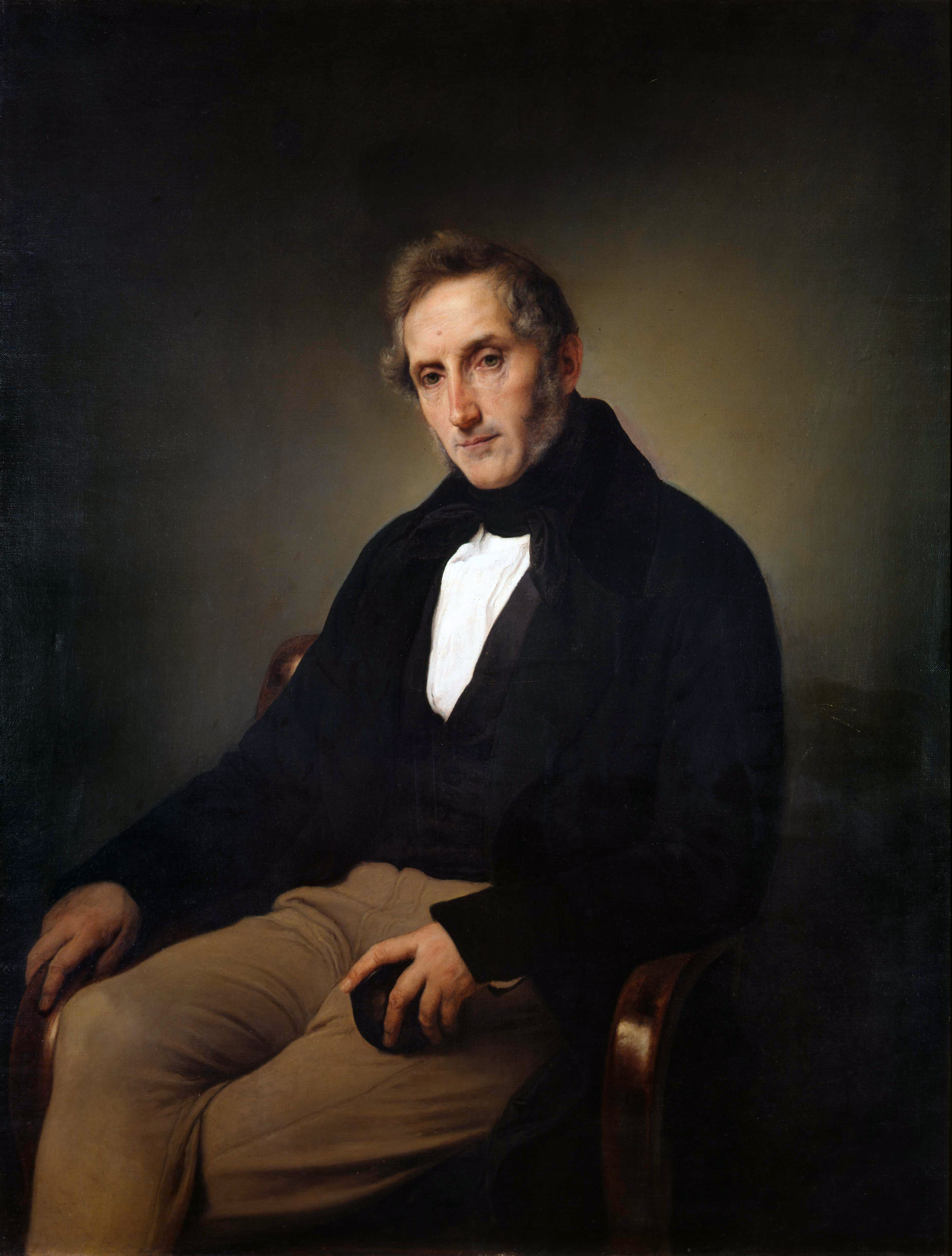
Alessandro Manzoni is famous for the novel The Betrothed (1827), generally ranked among the masterpieces of world literature. This novel is a fundamental milestone in the development of the modern, unified Italian language.

In the late 18th century and throughout the 19th, Milan was an important centre for intellectual discussion and literary creativity. The Enlightenment found here a fertile ground. Cesare, Marquis of Beccaria, with his famous Dei delitti e delle pene, and Count Pietro Verri, with the periodical Il Caffè were able to exert a considerable influence over the new middle-class culture.

In the first years of the 19th century, the ideals of the Romantic movement made their impact on the cultural life of the city and its major writers debated the primacy of Classical versus Romantic poetry. Additionally, Giuseppe Parini and Ugo Foscolo published their most important works, and were admired by younger poets as masters of ethics, as well as of literary craftsmanship.

In the third decade of the 19th century, Alessandro Manzoni wrote his novel The Betrothed, considered the manifesto of Italian Romanticism, which found in Milan its centre; in the same period Carlo Porta, reputed the most renowned local vernacular poet, wrote his poems in Lombard Language. The periodical Il Conciliatore published articles by Silvio Pellico, Giovanni Berchet, Ludovico di Breme, who were both Romantic in poetry and patriotic in politics.

After the Unification of Italy in 1861, Milan retained a sort of central position in cultural debates. New ideas and movements from other countries of Europe were accepted and discussed: thus Realism and Naturalism gave birth to prewar Italian movement of Verismo in Southern Italy, its greatest Verista novelist Giovanni Verga formed in Sicily who wrote his most important books in Milan.

In addition to Italian, approximately 2 million people in Northern Italy can speak the Milanese dialect or other Western Lombard varieties.

=== Media ===
Milan is an important national and international media center. RCS, a major international multimedia publishing group, is the publisher of both Corriere della Sera (established in 1876, it is one of the oldest Italian newspapers) and La Gazzetta dello Sport (a daily dedicated to sports, and the most widely-read in Italy). Other local dailies are the general broadsheets Il Giorno, Il Giornale, the Catholic newspaper Avvenire, and Il Sole 24 Ore, a daily business newspaper owned by Confindustria (the Italian employers' federation). Free daily newspapers include Leggo and Metro. Milan is also home to many architecture, art and fashion periodicals, including Abitare, Casabella, Domus, Flash Art, Gioia, Grazia and Vogue Italia. Panorama and Oggi, two of Italy's most important weekly news magazines, are also published in Milan. Several major television networks have their national headquarters in Milan and its metropolitan area, including Mediaset (the largest commercial broadcaster in the country), Sky Italia, the Italian division of Paramount Skydance, Telelombardia. National radio stations based in Milan include Radio DeeJay, Radio 105 Network, R101 (Italy), Radio Popolare, RTL 102.5, Radio Capital and Virgin Radio Italia.

=== Cuisine ===
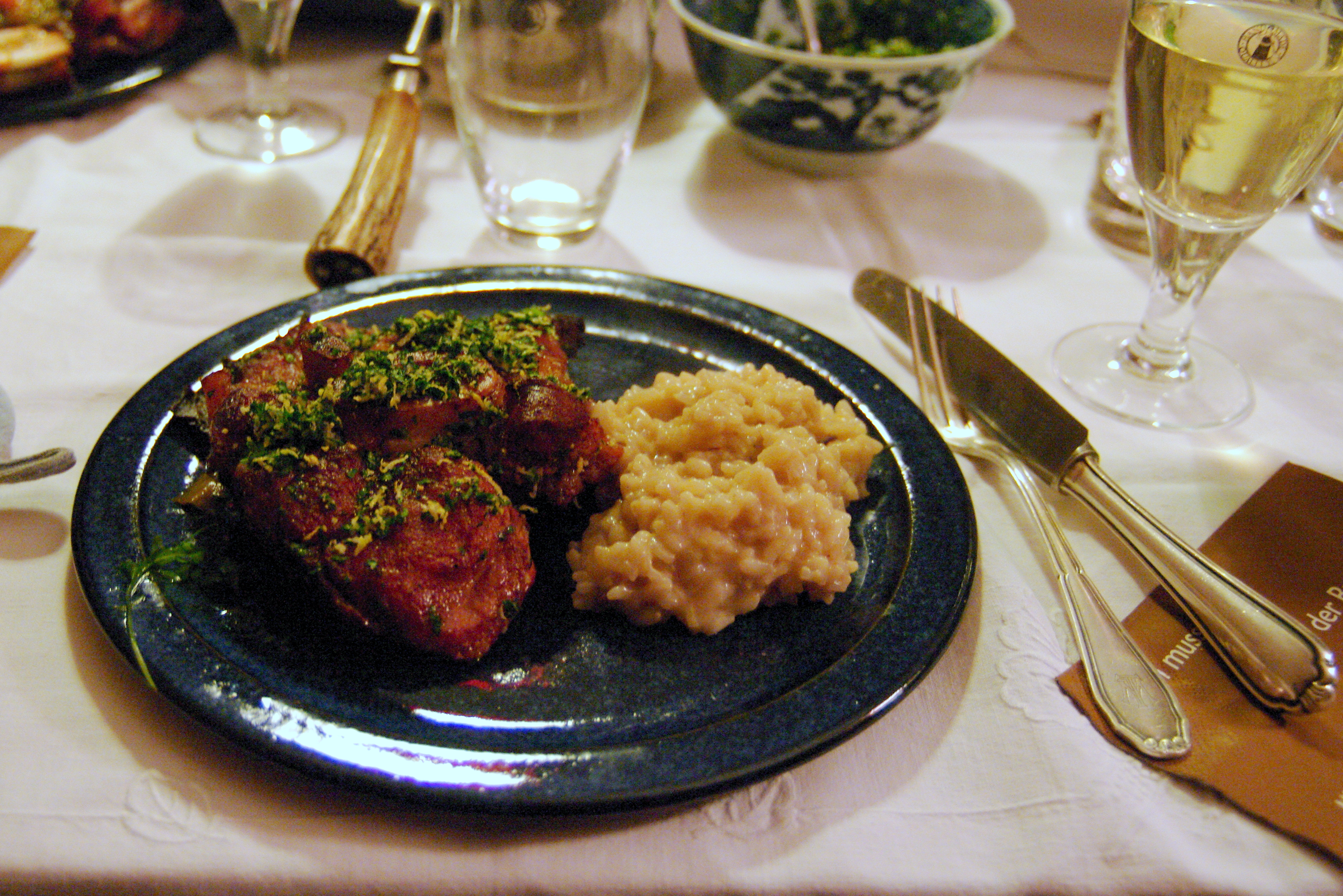
Ossobuco served with risotto alla milanese

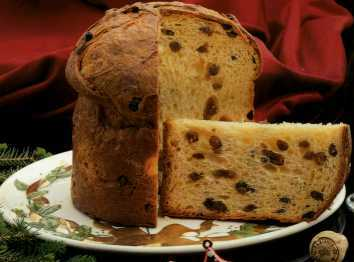
Panettone

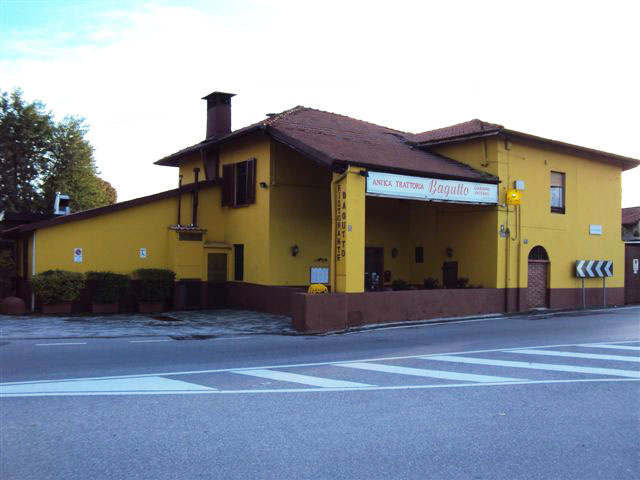
The Antica trattoria Bagutto in Milan, the oldest restaurant in Italy and the second oldest in Europe.

Like most cities in Italy, Milan has developed its own local culinary tradition, which, as it is typical for North Italian cuisines, uses more frequently rice than pasta, butter than vegetable oil and features almost no tomato or fish. Milanese traditional dishes include cotoletta alla milanese, a breaded veal (pork and turkey can be used) cutlet pan-fried in butter (similar to Viennese Wiener Schnitzel). Other typical dishes are cassoeula (stewed pork rib chops and sausage with Savoy cabbage), ossobuco (braised veal shank served with a condiment called gremolata), risotto alla milanese (with saffron and beef marrow), busecca (stewed tripe with beans), mondeghili (meatballs made with leftover meat fried in butter) and brasato (stewed beef or pork with wine and potatoes).

Season-related pastries include chiacchiere (flat fritters dusted with sugar) and tortelli (fried spherical cookies) for Carnival, colomba (glazed cake shaped as a dove) for Easter, pane dei morti ("bread of the (Day of the) Dead", cookies flavoured with cinnamon) for All Souls' Day and panettone for Christmas. The salame Milano, a salami with a very fine grain, is widespread throughout Italy. Renowned Milanese cheeses are gorgonzola (from the namesake village nearby), mascarpone, used in pastry-making, taleggio and quartirolo.

The comune of San Colombano al Lambro, located about 40 kilometres (25 mi) south-east of Milan, is home to the Denominazione di origine controllata (DOC) wine which includes 100 hectares (250 acres) producing a single red wine. The finished wine must attain a minimum alcohol level of 11% to be labelled with the San Colombano DOC designation.

Milan is well known for its world-class restaurants and cafés, characterised by innovative cuisine and design. As of 2014, Milan has 157 Michelin-selected places, including three 1-Michelin-starred restaurants; these include Cracco, Sadler and il Luogo di Aimo e Nadia. Many historical restaurants and bars are found in the historic centre, the Brera and Navigli districts. Milan is home to the oldest restaurant in Italy and the second in Europe, the Antica trattoria Bagutto, which has existed since at least 1284. One of the city's oldest surviving cafés, Caffè Cova, was established in 1817. In total, Milan has 15 cafés, bars and restaurants registered among the Historical Places of Italy, continuously operating for at least 70 years.

== Economy ==
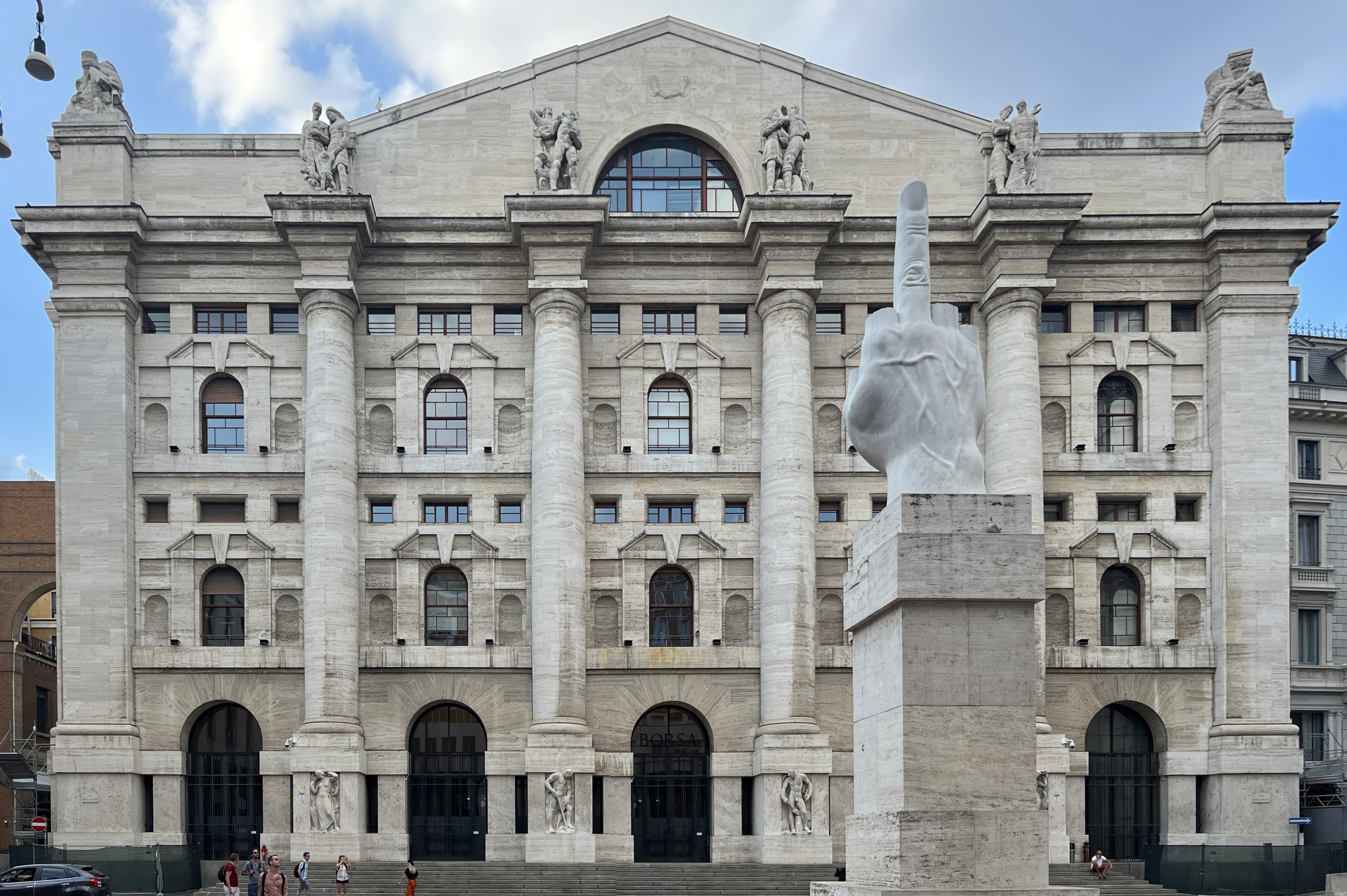
Palazzo Mezzanotte, the seat of the Italian stock exchange

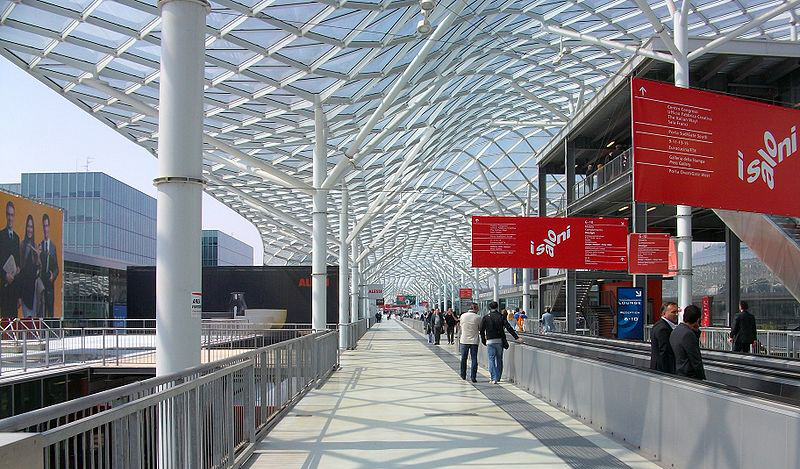
Fiera Milano, the most important trade fair organiser in Italy and the world's fourth largest

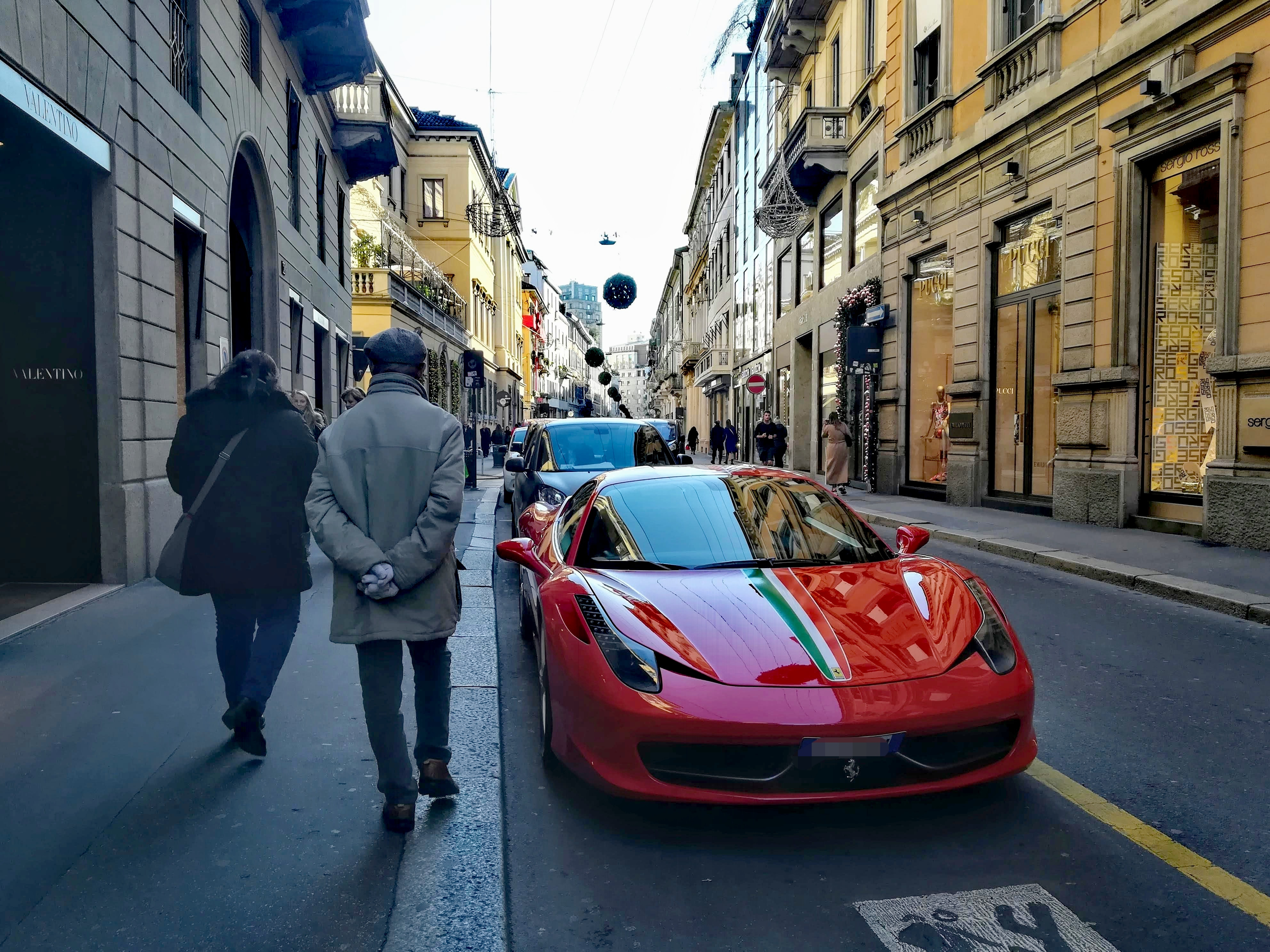
Via Monte Napoleone was Europe's and the world's most expensive street in 2024, outranking Fifth Avenue in New York City (the most expensive in 2023), but was outranked by New Bond Street in London in 2025.

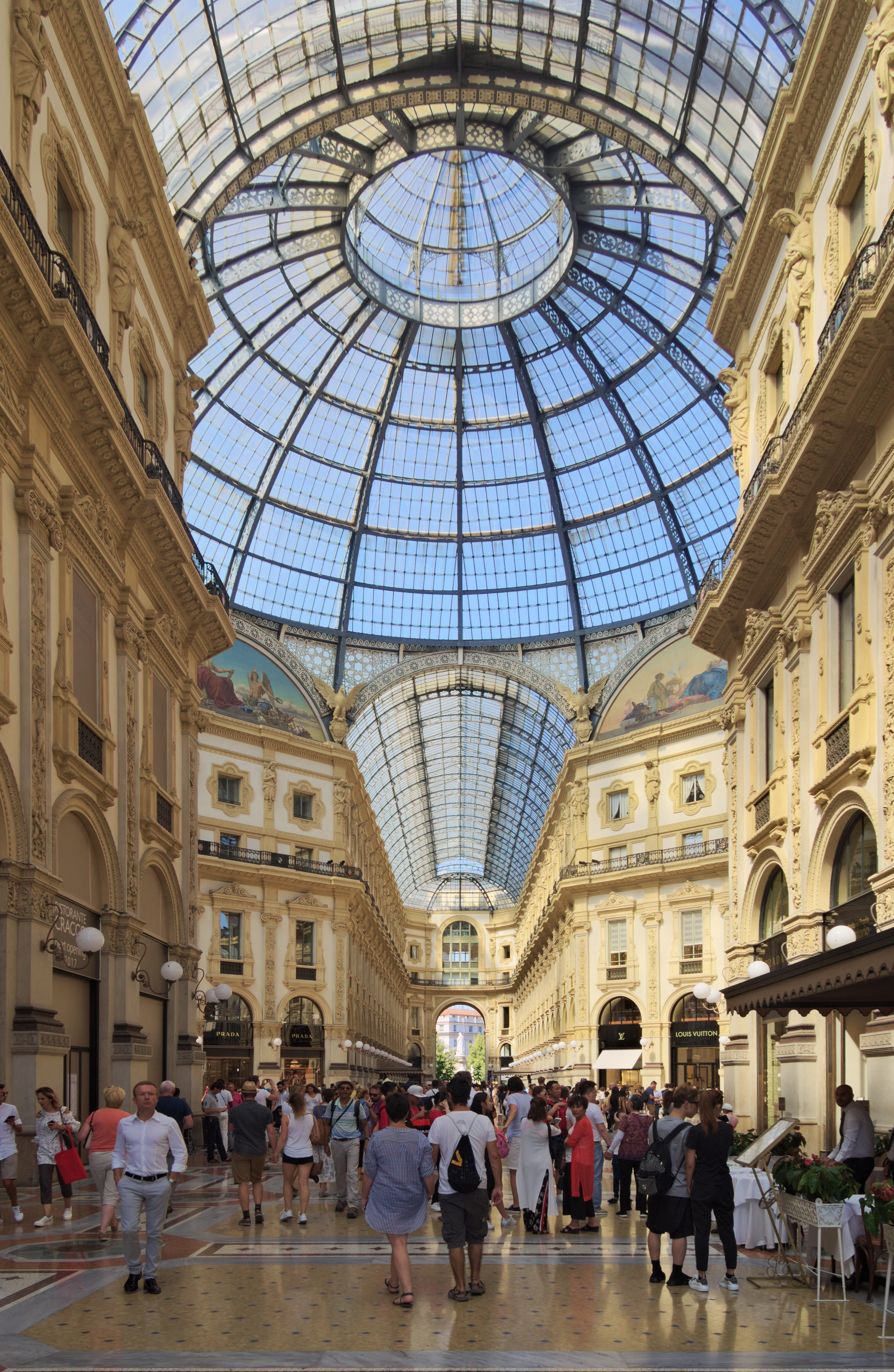
Galleria Vittorio Emanuele II is Italy's oldest active shopping gallery and a major landmark of Milan.

Whereas Rome is Italy's political capital, Milan is the country's industrial and financial heart, and it is widely considered the economic capital of Italy and one of the wealthiest cities in the country in terms of per-capita GDP. According to Eurostat, Milan's metropolitan region GDP was €228 billion ($265 billion) in 2024, while the whole Lombardy's gross regional product was €490 billion ($568 billion), the second-largest among EU regions.

Milan is a member of the Blue Banana corridor and of the Four Motors for Europe among Europe's economic leaders. The urban region of Milan is home to about 45% of businesses in the Lombardy region and more than 8 percent of all businesses in Italy, including three Fortune 500 companies. According to the Economist Intelligence Unit, Milan was the 11th-most-expensive city in Europe and the 22nd-most-expensive city in the world in 2019. Via Monte Napoleone has been defined as the most-expensive street in the world (2024).

Milan is one of the fashion capitals of the world, where the sector can count on 12,000 companies, 800 show rooms and 6,000 sales outlets; the city hosts the headquarters of global fashion houses such as Armani, Bottega Veneta, Costume National, Dolce & Gabbana, Dsquared², Etro, Jil Sander, Loro Piana, Luxottica, Marni, Moncler, Moschino, Prada, Versace, Valentino, Trussardi and Zegna and four weeks a year are dedicated to fashion events.

Since the late 1800s, the area of Milan has been a major industrial and manufacturing center. Alfa Romeo automobile company and Falck steel group employed thousands of workers in the city until the closure of their sites in Arese in 2004 and Sesto San Giovanni in 1995.

Other global industrial companies, such as Edison, Prysmian Group, Riva Group, Saras, Saipem, Luxottica, Pirelli, UniCredit and Techint, maintain their headquarters and significant employment in the city and its suburbs. Other relevant industries active in metro Milan include chemicals (e.g. Mapei, Versalis, Tamoil Italy), home appliances (e.g. Candy), hospitality (UNA Hotels & Resorts), food & beverages (e.g. Bertolli, Campari), machinery, medical technologies (e.g. Amplifon, Bracco), plastics and textiles. The construction (e.g. Webuild), retail (e.g. Esselunga, La Rinascente) and utilities (e.g. A2A, Edison S.p.A., Snam, Sorgenia) sectors are also large employers in the Greater Milan. Other major companies based in Milan include Fininvest, TIM Group and Banco BPM.

The main national insurance companies and banking groups (for a total of 198 companies) and over forty foreign insurance and banking companies are located in the city, as well as a number of asset management companies, including Anima Holding, Azimut Holding, ARCA SGR and Eurizon Capital. The Associazione Bancaria Italiana representing the Italian banking system, and Milan Stock Exchange (225 companies listed on the stock exchange) are both located in the city. Porta Nuova, the main business district of Milan and one of the most important in Europe, hosts the Italian headquarters of numerous global companies, such as Accenture, Axa, Bank of America, BNP Paribas, Celgene, China Construction Bank, Deutsche Bank, FM Global, Herbalife, Amazon, Iliad, KPMG, Maire Tecnimont, Mitsubishi UFJ Financial Group, Panasonic, Pirelli, Ubisoft, Shire, Tata Consultancy Services, Telecom Italia, UniCredit and UnipolSai.

Other large multinational service companies, such as Allianz, Generali, Alleanza Assicurazioni and PwC, have their headquarters in the CityLife business district, a new 900-acre-wide (3.6 km^{2}) development project designed by prominent modernist architects Zaha Hadid, Daniel Liebskind and Arata Isozaki.

The city is home to numerous media and advertising agencies, national newspapers and telecommunication companies, including both the public service broadcaster RAI and private television companies like Mediaset and Sky Italia. In addition, it hosts the headquarters of the largest Italian publishing companies, such as Feltrinelli, Giunti Editore, Messaggerie Italiane, Mondadori, RCS Media Group and Rusconi Libri. Milan has also seen a rapid increase in the presence of IT companies, with both domestic and international companies such as Altavista, Google, Italtel, Lycos, Microsoft, Virgilio and Yahoo! establishing their Italian operations in the city.

The city is also a global hub for event management and trade fairs. Fiera Milano operates the most important trade fair organiser in Italy and the world's fourth-largest exhibition hall in Rho, were international exhibitions like Milan Furniture Fair, EICMA, EMO take place on 400,000 square metres of exhibition areas with more than 4 million visitors in 2018.

=== Tourism ===
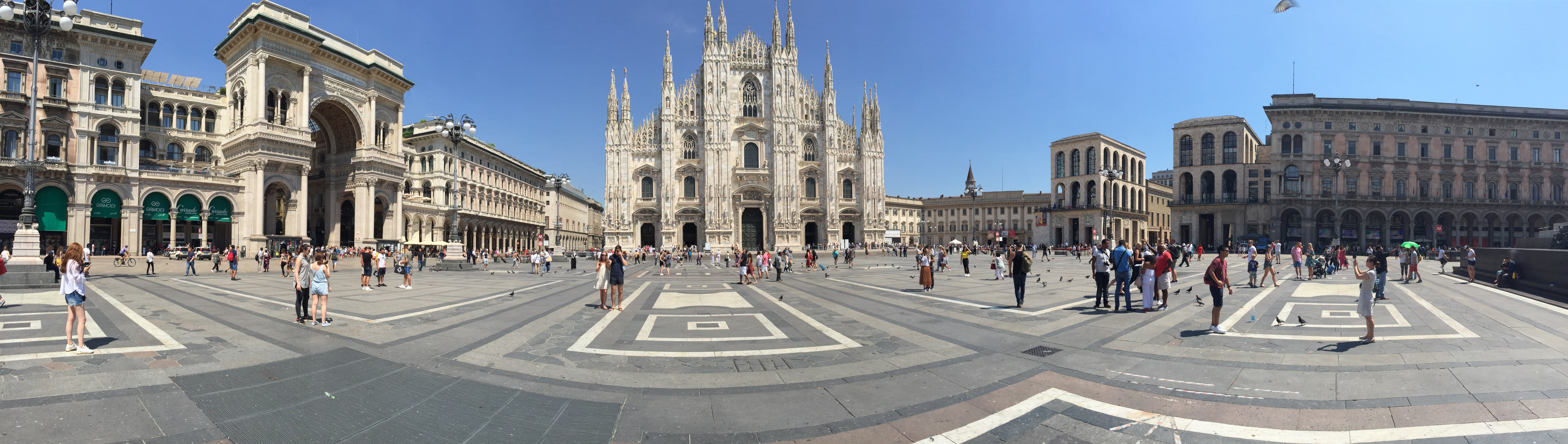
The Galleria Vittorio Emanuele II, the Milan Cathedral, the Royal Palace of Milan and the Palazzo dell'Arengario on Piazza del Duomo

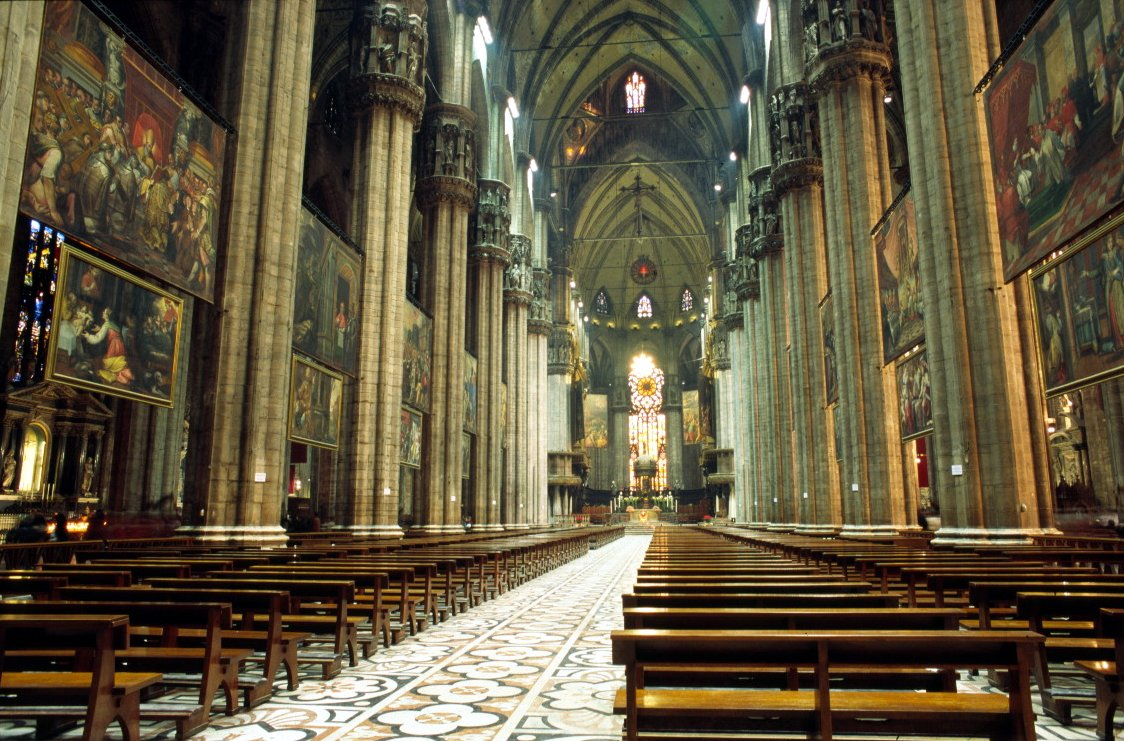
Interior of the Milan Cathedral, the city's most popular tourist destination.

Tourism is an increasingly important part of the city's economy: with 8.81 million registered international arrivals in 2018 (up 9.92% on the previous year), Milan ranked as the world's 15th-most-visited city. One source has 56% of international visitors to Milan are from Europe, 44% of the city's tourists are Italian, and 56% are from abroad. The most important European markets are the United Kingdom (16%), Germany (9%) and France (6%). Most of the visitors who come from the United States to the city go on business matters, while Chinese and Japanese tourists mainly take up the leisure segment. Milan is one of the international tourism destinations, appearing among the forty most visited cities in the world, ranking second in Italy after Rome, fifth in Europe and sixteenth in the world.

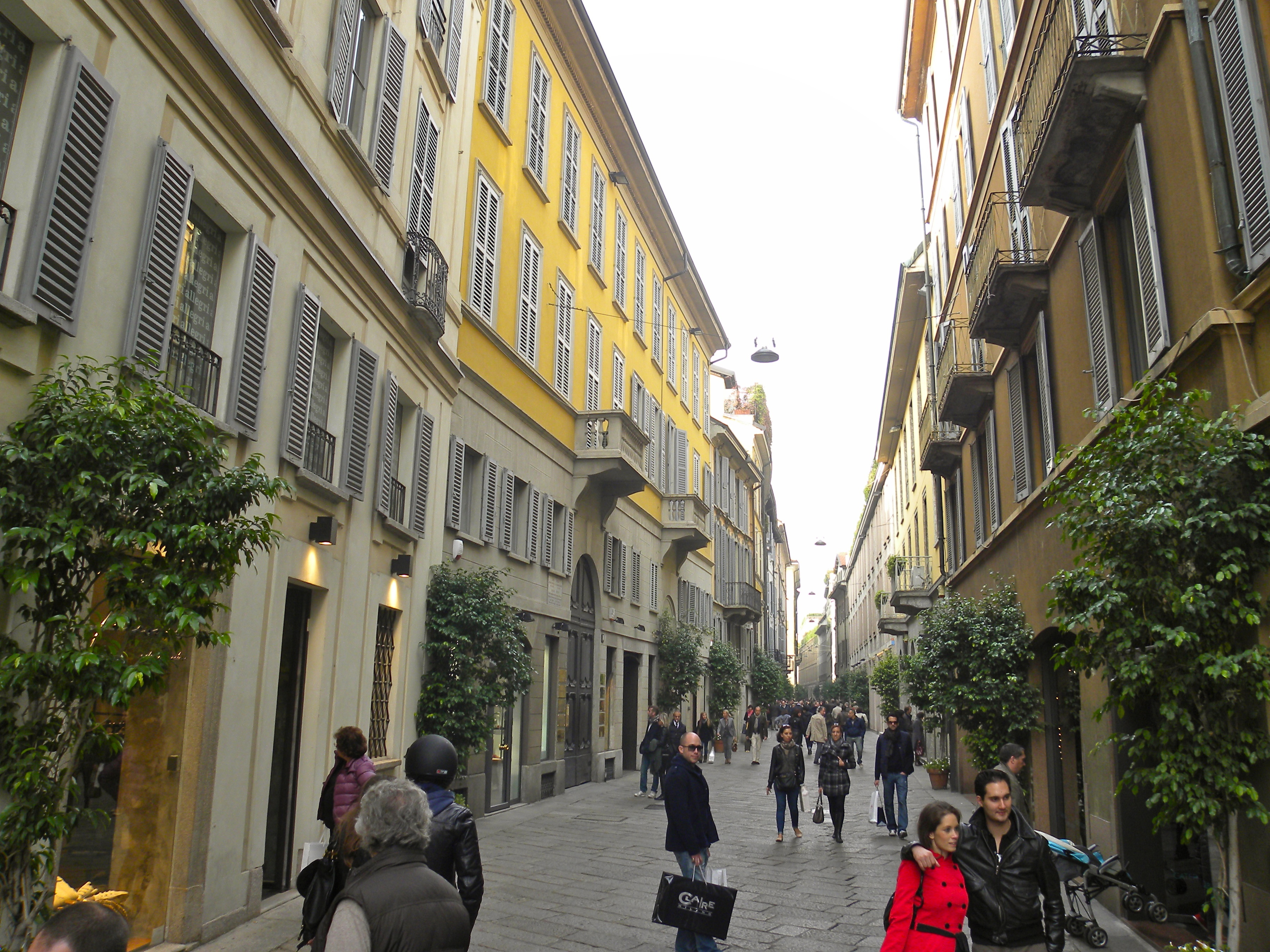
Via della Spiga, one of the main shopping streets in Milan, is part of the luxurious Quadrilatero della Moda (Fashion Quadrilateral) along with Via Monte Napoleone, Via Manzoni, Via Sant'Andrea and Corso Venezia.

The city boasts several popular tourist attractions, such as the Milan Cathedral and Piazza del Duomo, the Teatro alla Scala, the San Siro Stadium, the Galleria Vittorio Emanuele II, the Castello Sforzesco, the Pinacoteca di Brera and the Via Montenapoleone. Most tourists visit sights such as Milan Cathedral, the Castello Sforzesco and the Teatro alla Scala; however, other main sights such as the Basilica di Sant'Ambrogio, the Navigli and the Brera district are less visited and prove to be less popular. The city also has numerous hotels, including the ultra-luxurious Town House Galleria, which is the world's first seven-star hotel according to Société Générale de Surveillance (five-star superior luxury according to state law, however) and one of The Leading Hotels of the World.

== Transport ==
Milan is one of the key transport nodes of Italy and southern Europe. Its central railway station is Italy's second, after Rome Termini railway station, and Europe's eighth busiest. The Malpensa, Linate and Orio al Serio airports serve the Greater Milan, the largest metropolitan area in Italy.

Azienda Trasporti Milanesi (ATM) is the Milanese municipal transport company; it operates five metro lines, 18 tram lines, 131 bus lines, four trolleybus lines and one people mover line, carrying about 776 million passengers in 2018. Overall the network covers nearly 1,500 km (932 mi) reaching 46 municipalities. Besides public transport, ATM manages the interchange parking lots and other transport services, including bike sharing and carsharing systems.

=== Rail ===
==== Underground ====
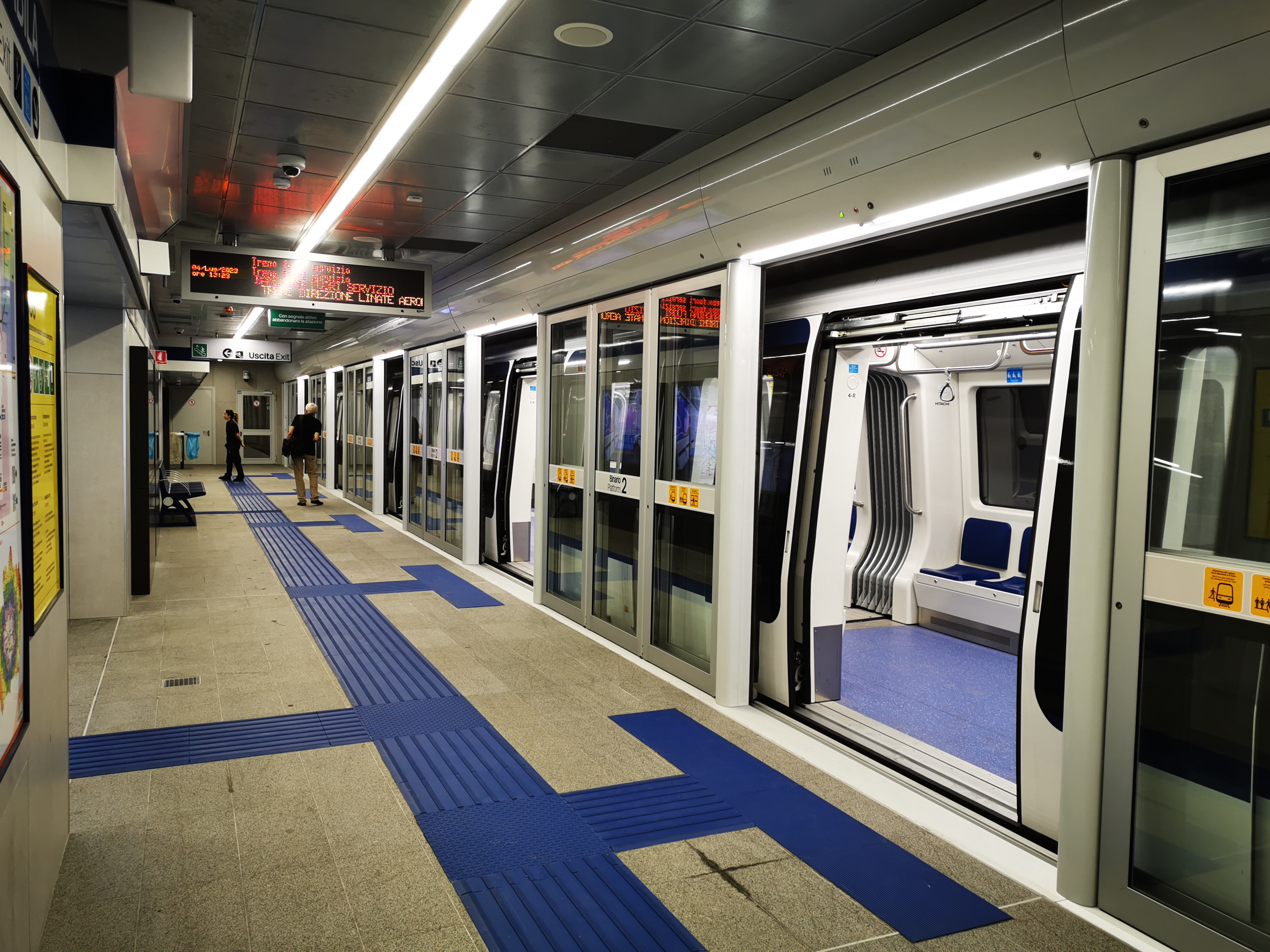
Milan Metro is the largest rapid transit system in Italy in terms of length, number of stations and ridership; and the fifth longest in the European Union and the eighth in the Europe.

The Milan Metro is the rapid transit system serving the city and surrounding municipalities. The network consists of five lines (M1, M2, M3, M4 and M5), with a total network length of 112 kilometres (70 mi), and a total of 125 stations, mostly underground. It has a daily ridership of 1.15 million, the largest in Italy as well as one of the largest in Europe.

The architectural project of the Milan Metro, created by Franco Albini and Franca Helg, and the signs, designed by Bob Noorda, received the Compasso d'Oro award in 1964. In the European Union, it is the seventh-largest network in terms of kilometres.

==== Suburban ====
As of September 2025, the Milan suburban railway service, operated by Trenord, comprises 12 S lines connecting the metropolitan area with the city centre, with possible transfers to all the metro lines. Most S lines run through the Milan Passerby Railway, commonly referred to as "il Passante" and mostly served by double-decker trains every 4/8 minutes in the central underground section, between Porta Vittoria and Lancetti.

==== National and international trains ====
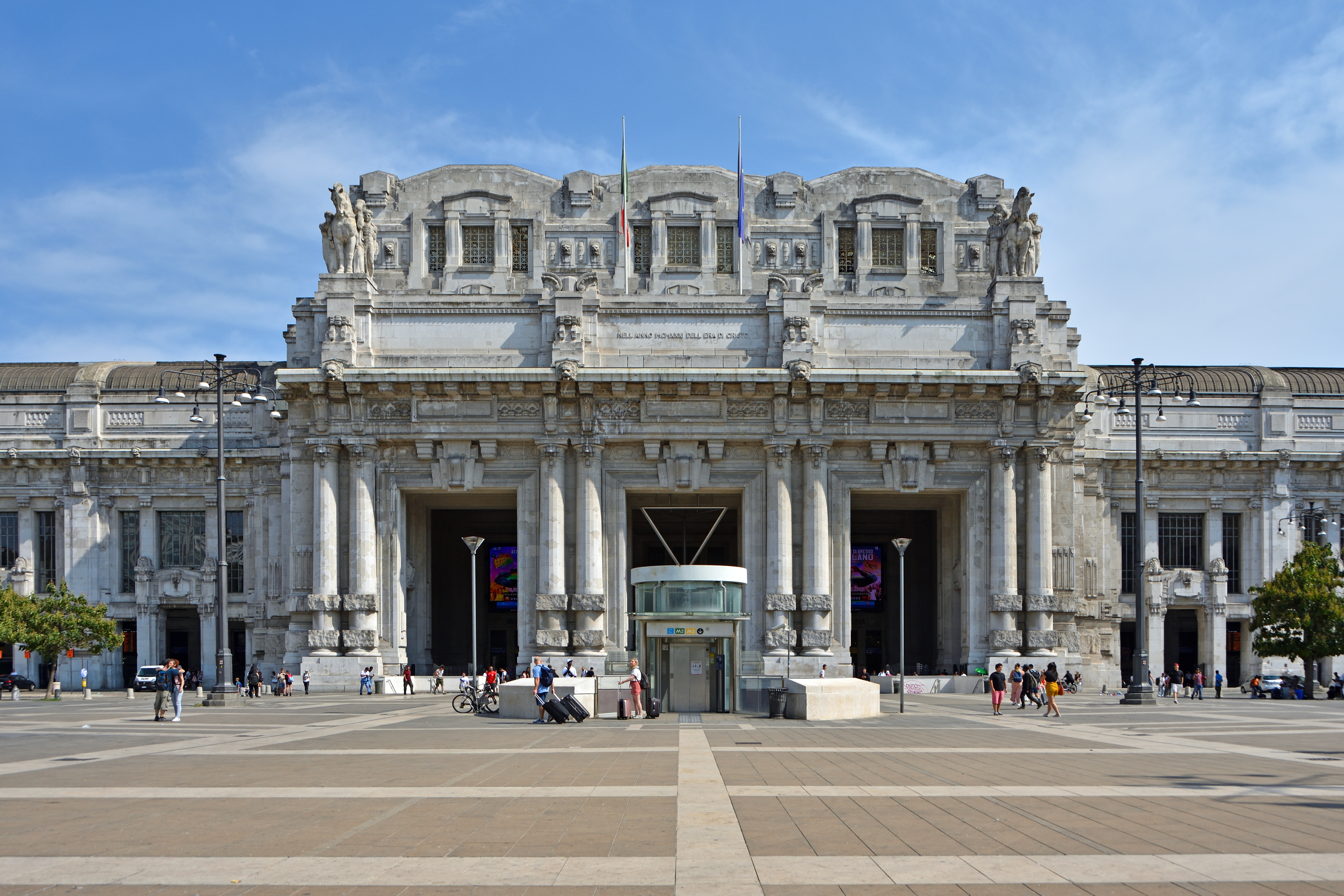
Milano Centrale railway station

Milan Central station, with 110 million passengers per year, is the largest and eighth-busiest railway station in Europe and the second busiest in Italy after Roma Termini. Milano Centrale railway station is the largest railway station in Europe by volume. Milano Cadorna and Milano Porta Garibaldi stations are, respectively, the seventh- and the eleventh-busiest stations in Italy, mostly served by regional and suburban trains.

Since the end of 2009, two high-speed train lines link Milan to Rome, Naples and Turin, considerably shortening travel times with other major cities in Italy. Since 2016, a further high-speed line connects the city to Brescia, as part of the line towards Verona and Venice, which is still under construction, while parts of the line towards Genoa are underway, as of May 2025. Milan is served by direct international trains to Nice, Marseille, Lyon, Paris, Lugano, Geneva, Bern, Basel, Zurich and Frankfurt, and by overnight sleeper services to Munich and Vienna (ÖBB). Since 2011, Trenord has operated both Trenitalia and LeNord regional trains in Lombardy, carrying over 750,000 passengers on more than 50 routes every day.

Trenitalia and S.N.C.F. provide high speed services to Paris, stopping at Lyon and Turin.

=== Buses and trams ===
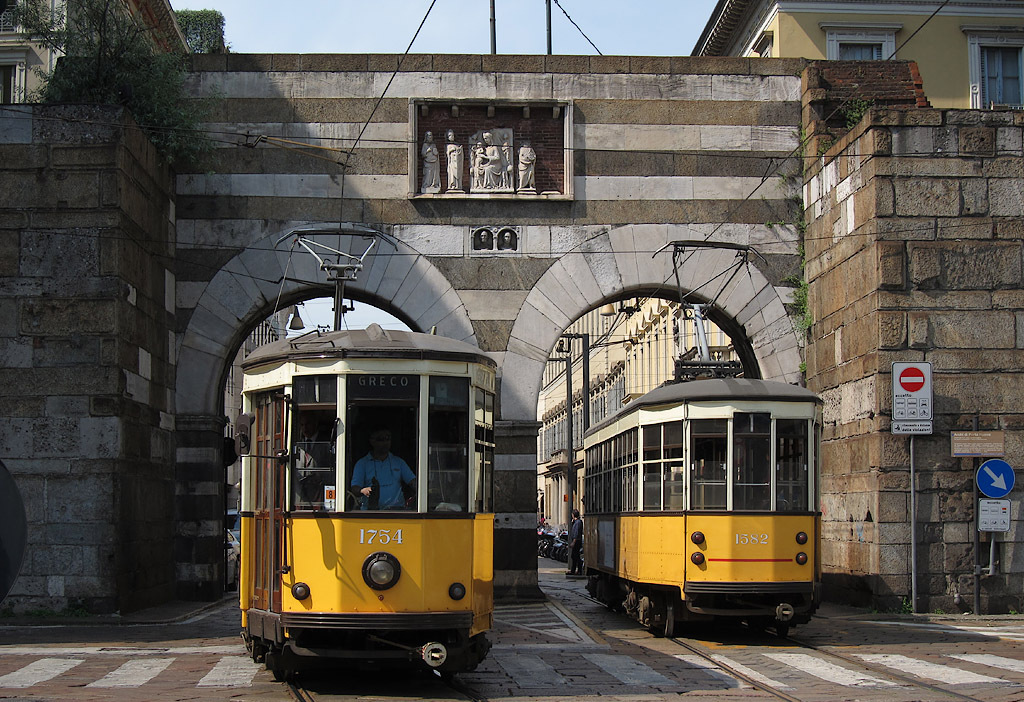
Intersecting trams under the arcs of Porta Nuova medieval gate. This type of historical tram is also used in San Francisco, United States

The city tram network consists of approximately 160 kilometres (99 mi) of track and 18 lines, and is Europe's most advanced light rail system. Bus lines cover over 1,070 km (665 mi). Milan also has taxi services operated by private companies and licensed by the City Council of Milan. The city is also a key node for the national road network, being served by all the major highways of Northern Italy. Numerous long-distance bus lines link Milan with many other cities and towns in Lombardy and throughout Italy.

=== Airports ===
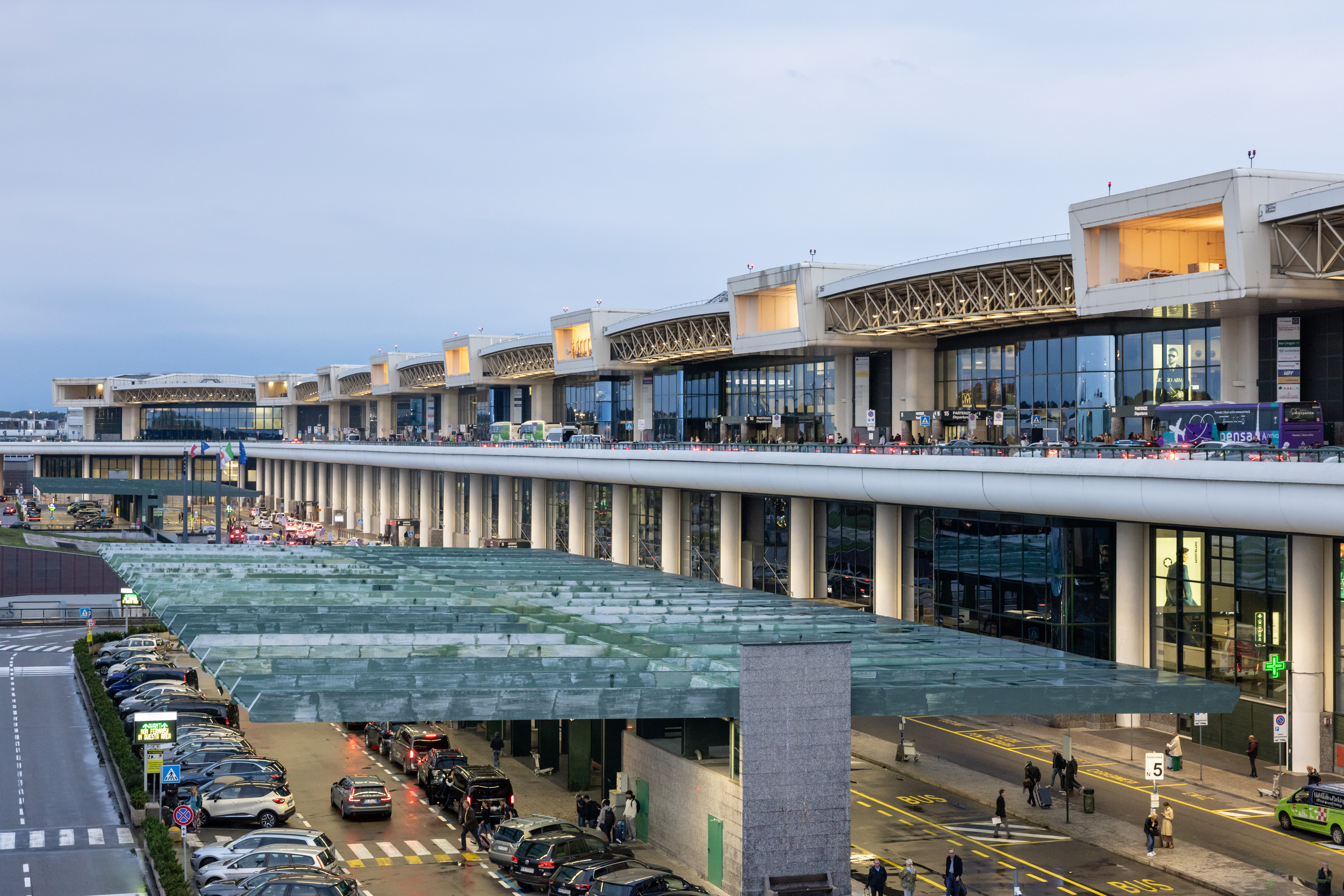
Milan Malpensa Airport

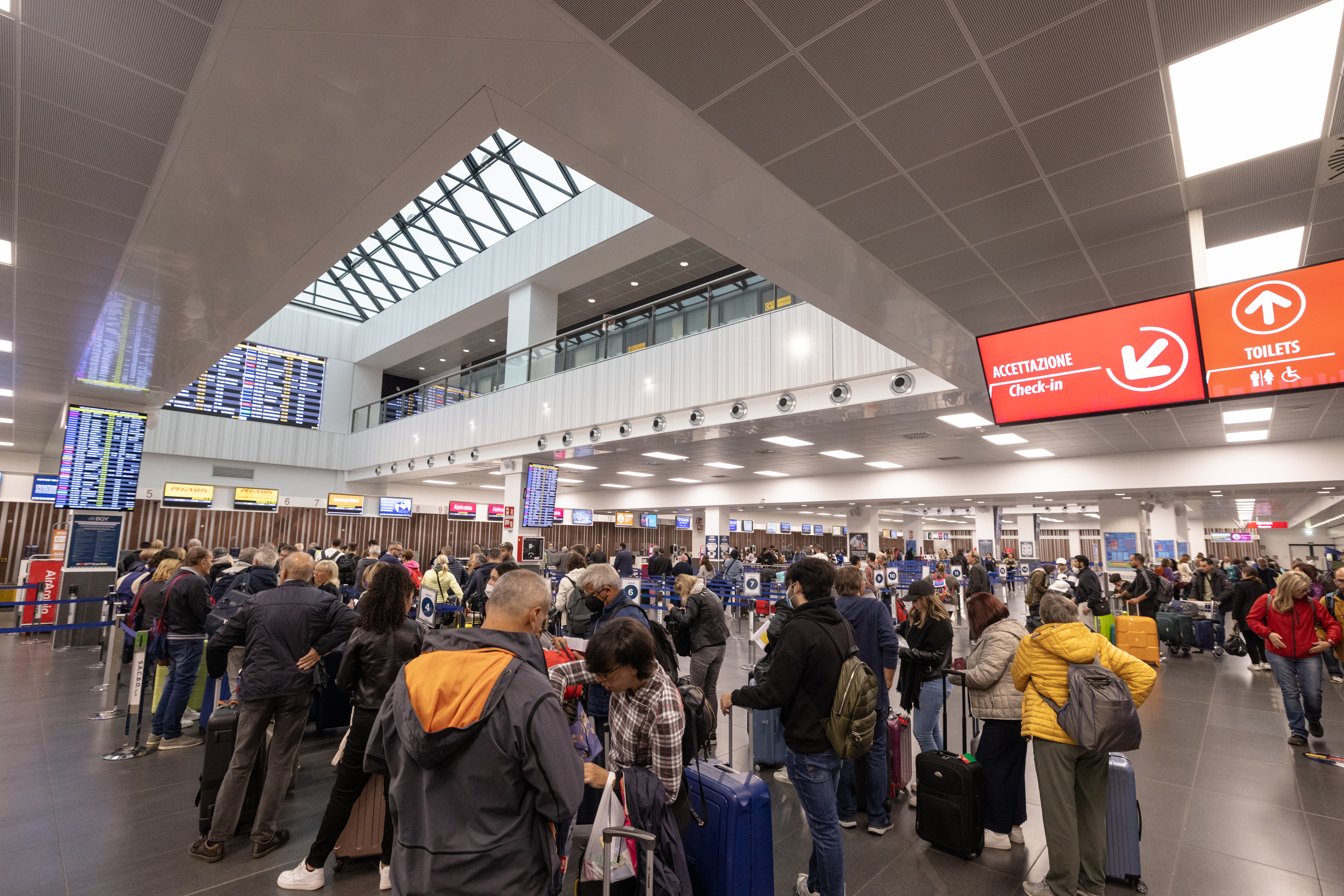
Departures area of the Milan Bergamo Airport

In the surroundings of Milan, there are three airports dedicated to normal civilian traffic (Milan Malpensa Airport and Milan Linate Airport, managed by SEA, and Milan Bergamo Airport by SACBO).

Overall, the Milan airport system handles traffic of over 51.4 million passengers and around 700,000 tons of goods every year and is the first in Italy in terms of passenger volume and cargo volume (the second Italian airport system is Rome with 44.4 million passengers in 2023). The Milan Malpensa airport, with over 700 thousand tons, confirms the national leadership, processing 70% of the country's air cargo.

- The intercontinental hub of Milan Malpensa Airport (MXP) is Italy's second-busiest airport, after Rome Fiumicino Airport, with 24.1 million passengers served in 2023 and Italy's busiest for freight and cargo, handling about 700,000 tons of international freight in 2022. Malpensa Airport is the largest international airport in northern Italy, serving Lombardy, Piedmont and Liguria, as well as the Swiss canton of Ticino. The airport is located 49 kilometres (30 mi) north-west of Milan, in the province of Varese next to the Ticino river dividing Lombardy and Piedmont. Malpensa airport is ninth in the world and sixth in Europe for the number of countries served with direct scheduled flights It is connected to Milan by the Malpensa Express railway service and by various bus lines. The airport is located inside the Parco naturale lombardo della Valle del Ticino, a nature reserve included by UNESCO in the World Network of Biosphere Reserves.
- Milan Linate Airport (LIN) is Milan's city airport, less than 8 kilometres (5 mi) from central Milan, and is mainly used for domestic and short-haul international flights. It served 8.6 million passengers in 2023 ranking as the eighth airport in Italy for passenger traffic. Linate Airport is a focus city for ITA Airways (with Rome Fiumicino Airport as the main hub), and is connected the centre of Milan via the M4 blue metro line.
- Milan Bergamo Airport (BGY) is mainly used for low-cost, charter and cargo flights. The airport is located in Orio al Serio, 3.7 km (2.3 mi) south-east of Bergamo and 45 km (28 mi) north-east of Milan. It is one of Ryanair's three main operating bases, along with Dublin Airport and London Stansted Airport. It served 14.7 million passengers in 2023. A bus service operated by ATB connects to the airport, about 10 minutes from the Bergamo railway station.

Lastly, Bresso Airfield is a general aviation airport, operated by Aero Club Milano. Since 1960, the airport mostly serves as a general aviation airfield for flying club activity, tourist flights and air taxi. It also hosts a base of the state helicopter emergency service Elisoccorso.

=== Cycling ===
The bicycle is becoming an increasingly important mode of transportation in Milan. Since 2008, the implementation of a city-wide network of bike paths has been initiated, to fight congestion and air pollution. During the COVID pandemic in 2019, 35 km of bike lanes were realized on short notice, to relieve pressure on the subway occupation.

The bike sharing system BikeMi operates throughout most of the city and has become increasingly popular. In addition, several commercial dockless bicycle and scooter sharing services are widely available.

== Education ==
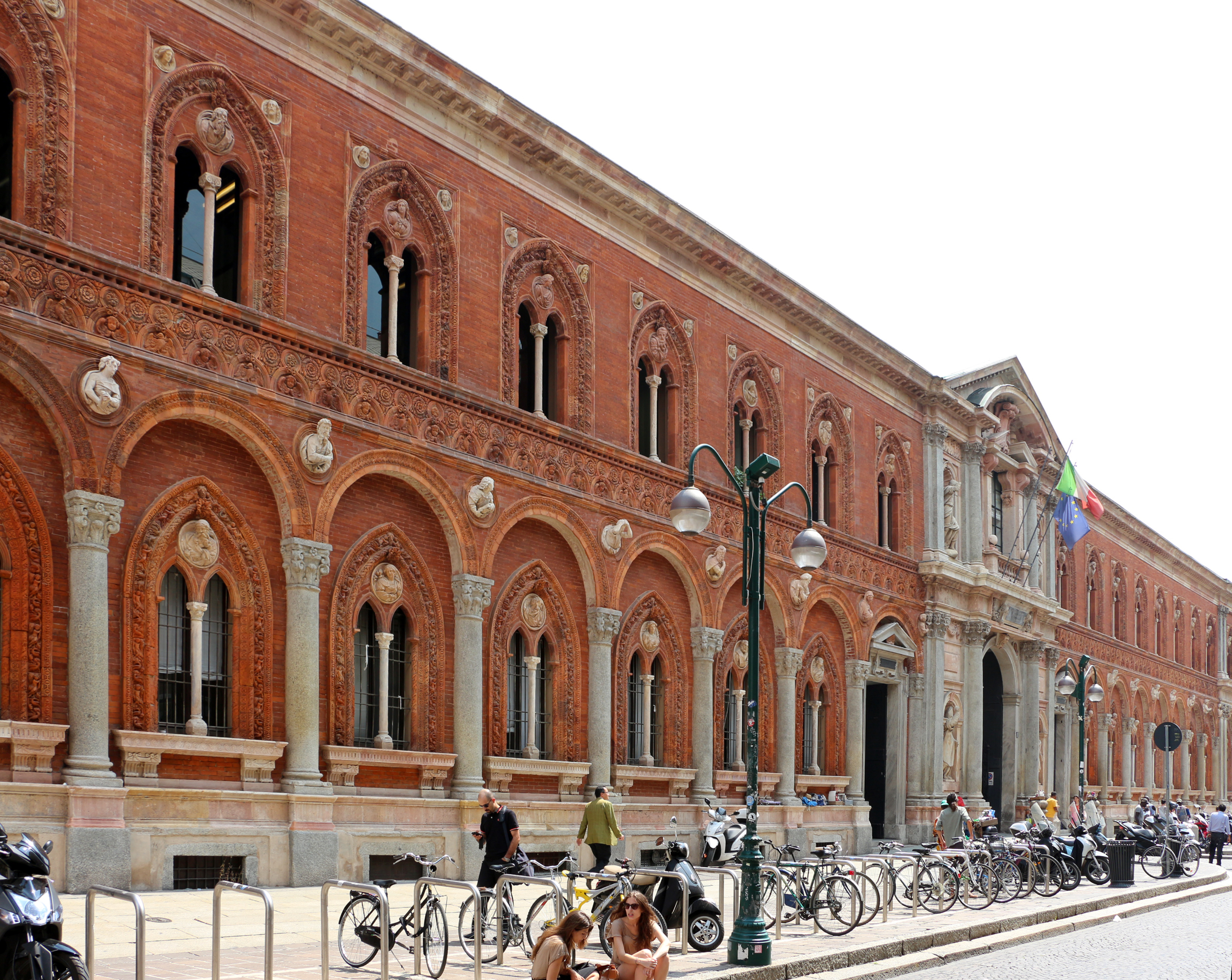
Built in 1456 by Francesco I Sforza, Duke of Milan, the Ca' Granda designed by the Renaissance period architect Filarete is the headquarters of the University of Milan, often ranked as the best in Italy in Medicine.

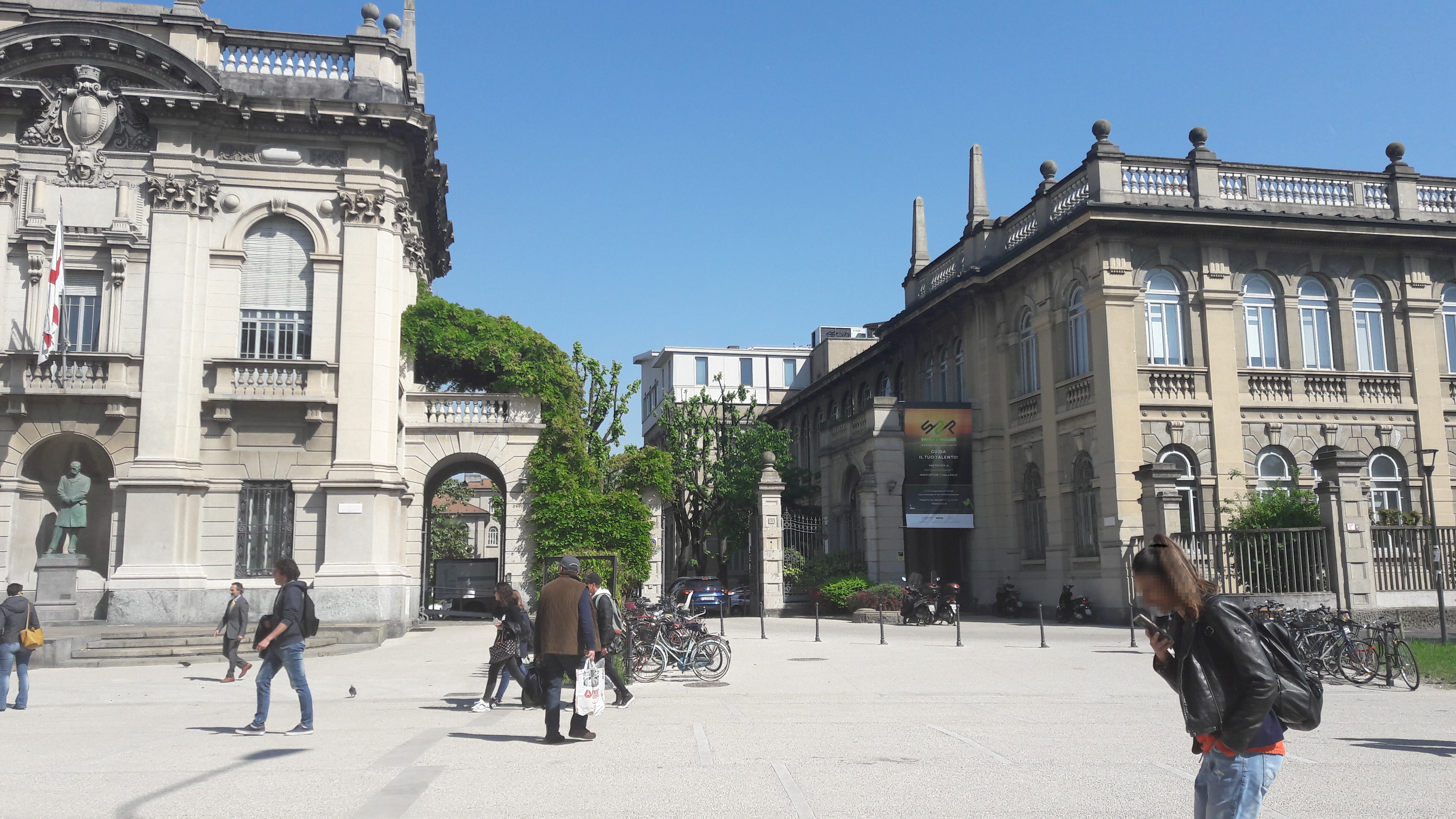
The Polytechnic University of Milan is the city's oldest university, founded in 1863. It is often ranked as the best university in Italy and Southern Europe, and is one of the world's top universities in Architecture, Design, Engineering and Technology.

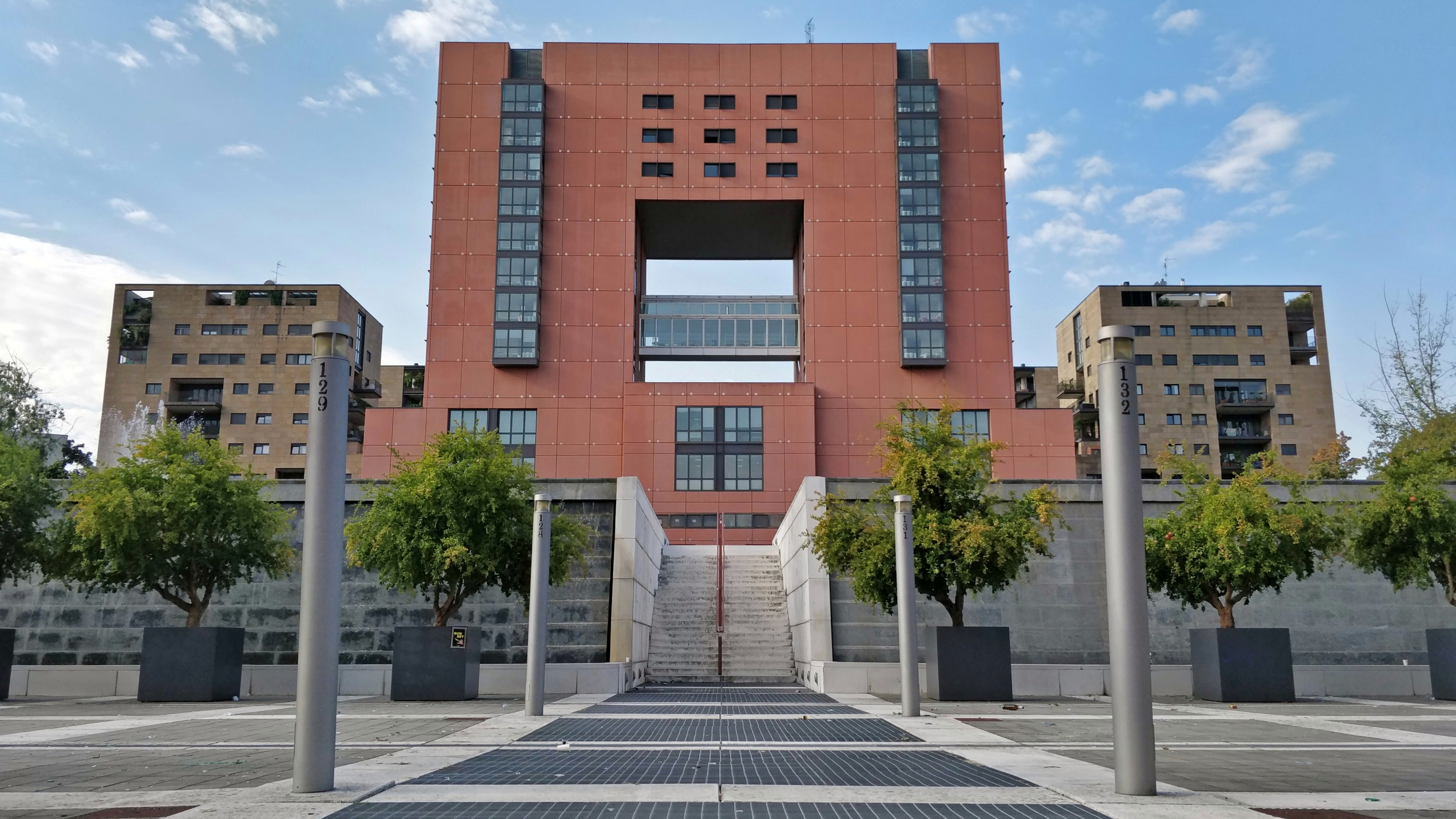
University of Milan Bicocca, established in 1998, is the city's newest university.

Milan is a major global centre of higher education teaching and research and has the second-largest concentration of higher education institutes in Italy after Rome. Milan's higher education system includes 7 universities, 48 faculties and 142 departments, with 185,000 university students enrolled in 2011 (approximately 11 percent of the national total) and the largest number of university graduates and postgraduate students (34,000 and more than 5,000, respectively) in Italy.

=== Universities ===
The Polytechnic University of Milan is the city's oldest university, founded in 1863. With over 40,000 students, it is the largest technical university in Italy. According to the QS World University Rankings for the subject area "Engineering & Technology", it ranked as the 13th best in the world in 2022. It ranked 6th worldwide in "Design", 7th in "Architecture", 9th in "Civil and Structural Engineering", and 9th in "Mechanical and Aerospace Engineering". As of 2025 it is the best university in Italy and Southern Europe according to the QS Top Universities list, having consistently retained the first rank for many years.

The University of Milan (also known as the "State University"), founded in 1924, is the largest public teaching and research university in the city. It is the only Italian member of the League of European Research Universities (LERU), an elite group of 24 research-intensive European universities, which it helped found. It is the sixth-largest university in Italy in terms of enrolment, with approximately 60,000 enrolled students, and a teaching staff of 2,500. The university ranks high in the fields of medicine, physics, mathematics, law, political science, sociology, philosophy, history, economics, statistics, geoscience and astronomy. Notable alumni such as former Italian Prime Minister Silvio Berlusconi and Nobel laureates have earned their degrees at the University of Milan. In 2026 the University of Milan ranked 1st in Italy and 65th in the world in the field of Medicine according to the QS World University Rankings. The Faculty of Medicine and Surgery at the University of Milan consistently ranks among the world's top 100 medical schools. According to the global rankings of the USNWR in 2025, the University of Milan ranked 15th in the world in Gastroenterology and Hepatology, 43rd in Oncology, 53rd in Surgery, Pharmacology and Toxicology, 54th in Clinical medicine, 64th in Radiology, Nuclear medicine and Medical imaging, 68th in Cardiology and Cardiovascular systems, 77th in Infectious diseases, 78th in Endocrinology and Metabolism, 80th in Neuroscience and Behavioural sciences, and 98th in Immunology.

The University of Milano-Bicocca, established in 1998, is the city's newest institution of higher education in science and technology. Built over a once industrial area, today it enrolls more than 30,000 students, of whom more than 60% are female. As its older parent institute, it is one of the most sought-after locations for medical students. It ranked 82nd among over 300 young colleges in the 2020 Times Higher Education World University Rankings.

Catholic University of the Sacred Heart is the largest private teaching university in Europe and the largest Catholic University in the world with 42,000 enrolled students. Agostino Gemelli University Polyclinic serves as the teaching hospital for the medical school of the Università Cattolica del Sacro Cuore and owes its name to the university founder, the Franciscan friar, physician and psychologist Agostino Gemelli.

Bocconi University is a private management and finance university established in 1902, ranking as the best university in Italy in its fields, and as one of the best in the world. In 2020, QS World University Rankings ranked the university seventh worldwide and third in Europe in business and management studies, as well as first in economics and econometrics outside the US and the UK. Financial Times ranked it the sixth-best business school in Europe in 2018. Bocconi University also ranks as the fifth-best one-year MBA course in the world, according to the Forbes 2017 ranking.

Vita-Salute San Raffaele University is a private teaching medical university linked to the San Raffaele Hospital.

University Institute of Languages and Communication (also known as "University IULM") is a private teaching university established in 1968, later renamed from its original name "University Institute of Languages of Milan", becoming first Italian university offering courses on public relations; later it became a point of reference also for business communication; media and advertising; translation and interpreting; communication in culture and arts markets, tourism and fashion.

=== Art academies ===
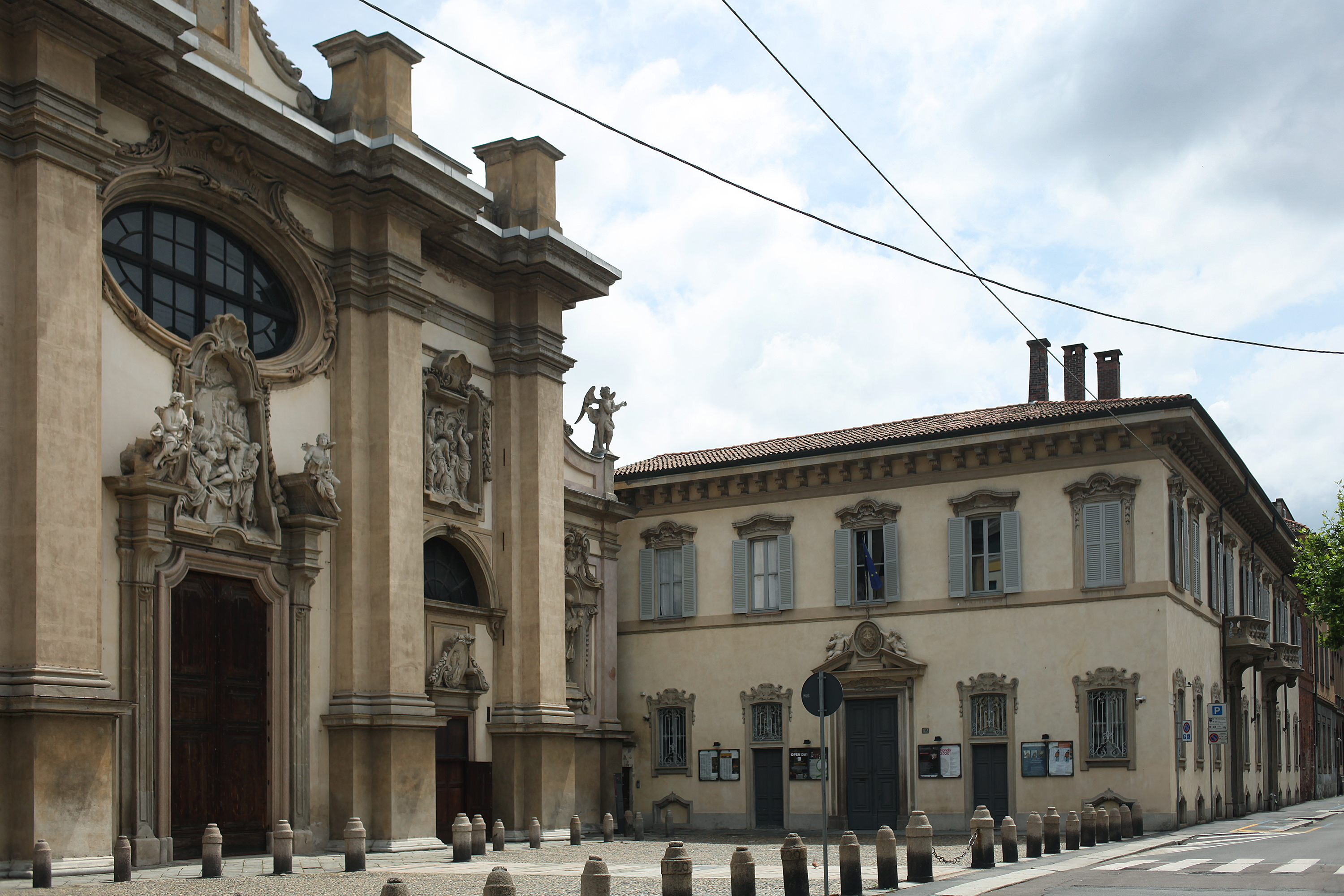
Milan Conservatory

Milan is also well known for its fine arts and music schools. The Milan Academy of Fine Arts (Brera Academy) is a public academic institution founded in 1776 by Empress Maria Theresa of Austria; the New Academy of Fine Arts is the largest private art and design university in Italy; the European Institute of Design is a private university specialised in fashion, industrial and interior design, audio/visual design including photography, advertising and marketing and business communication; the Marangoni Institute, is a fashion institute with campuses in Milan, London and Paris; the Domus Academy is a private postgraduate institution of design, fashion, architecture, interior design and management; the Pontifical Ambrosian Institute of Sacred Music, a college of music founded in 1931 by the blessed cardinal A.I. Schuster, archbishop of Milan, and raised according to the rules by the Holy See in 1940, is—similarly to the Pontifical Institute of Sacred Music in Rome, which is consociated with—an Institute "ad instar facultatis" and is authorised to confer university qualifications with canonical validity and the Milan Conservatory, a college of music established in 1807, currently Italy's largest with more than 1,700 students and 240 music teachers.

== Sport ==
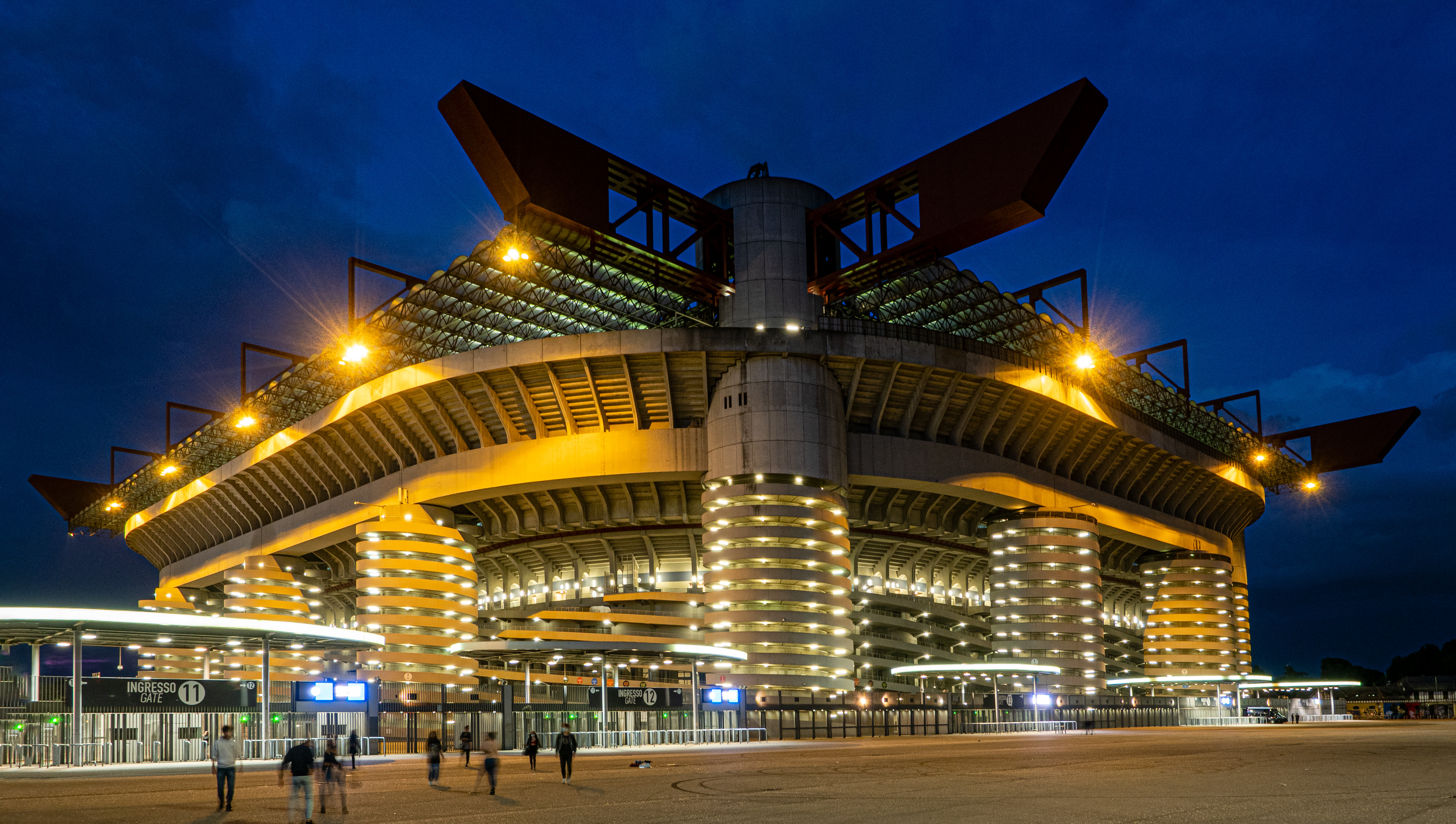
San Siro Stadium, home of AC Milan and Inter Milan, is Italy's biggest stadium and has a capacity of 80,000.

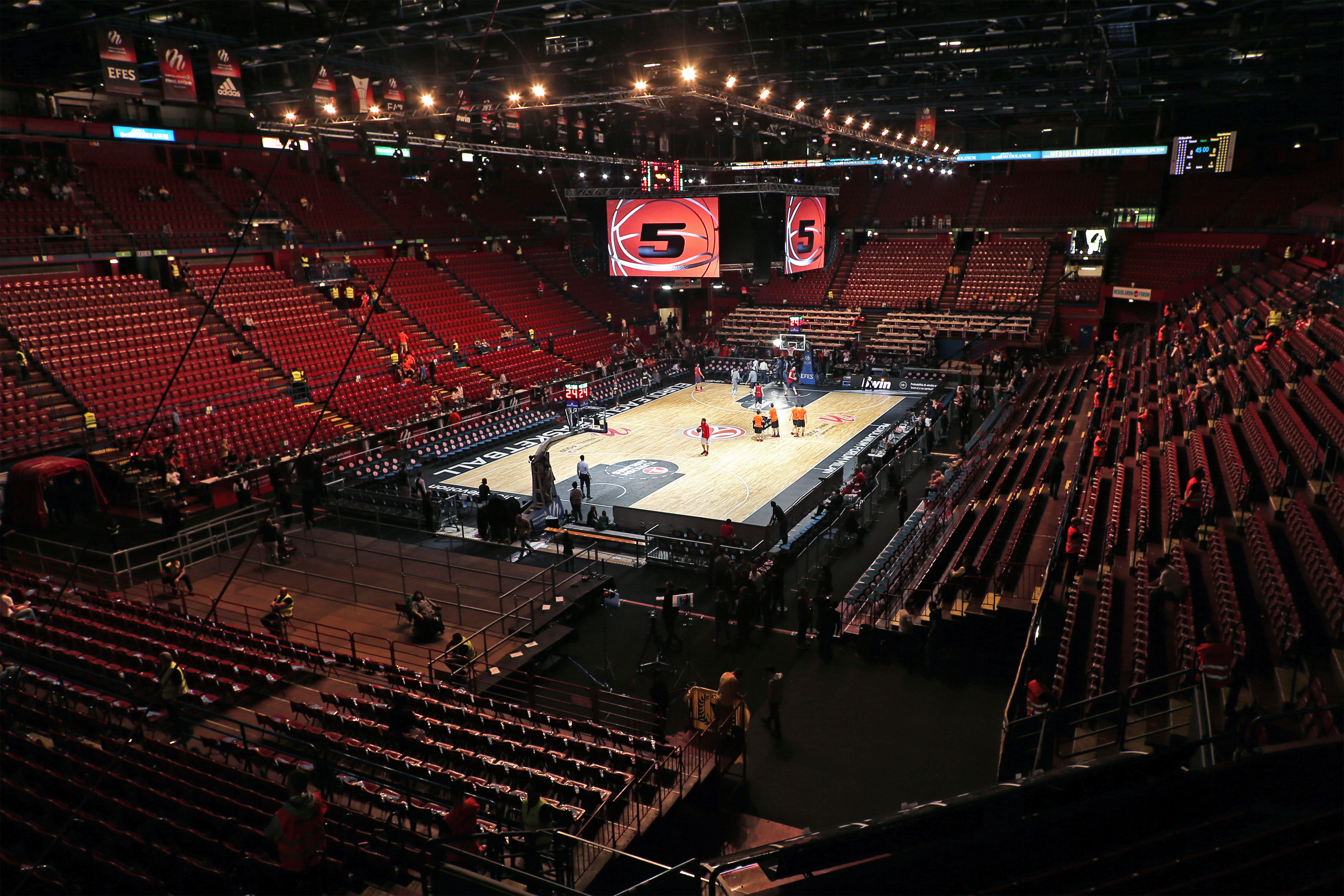
Mediolanum Forum, home of Olimpia Milano

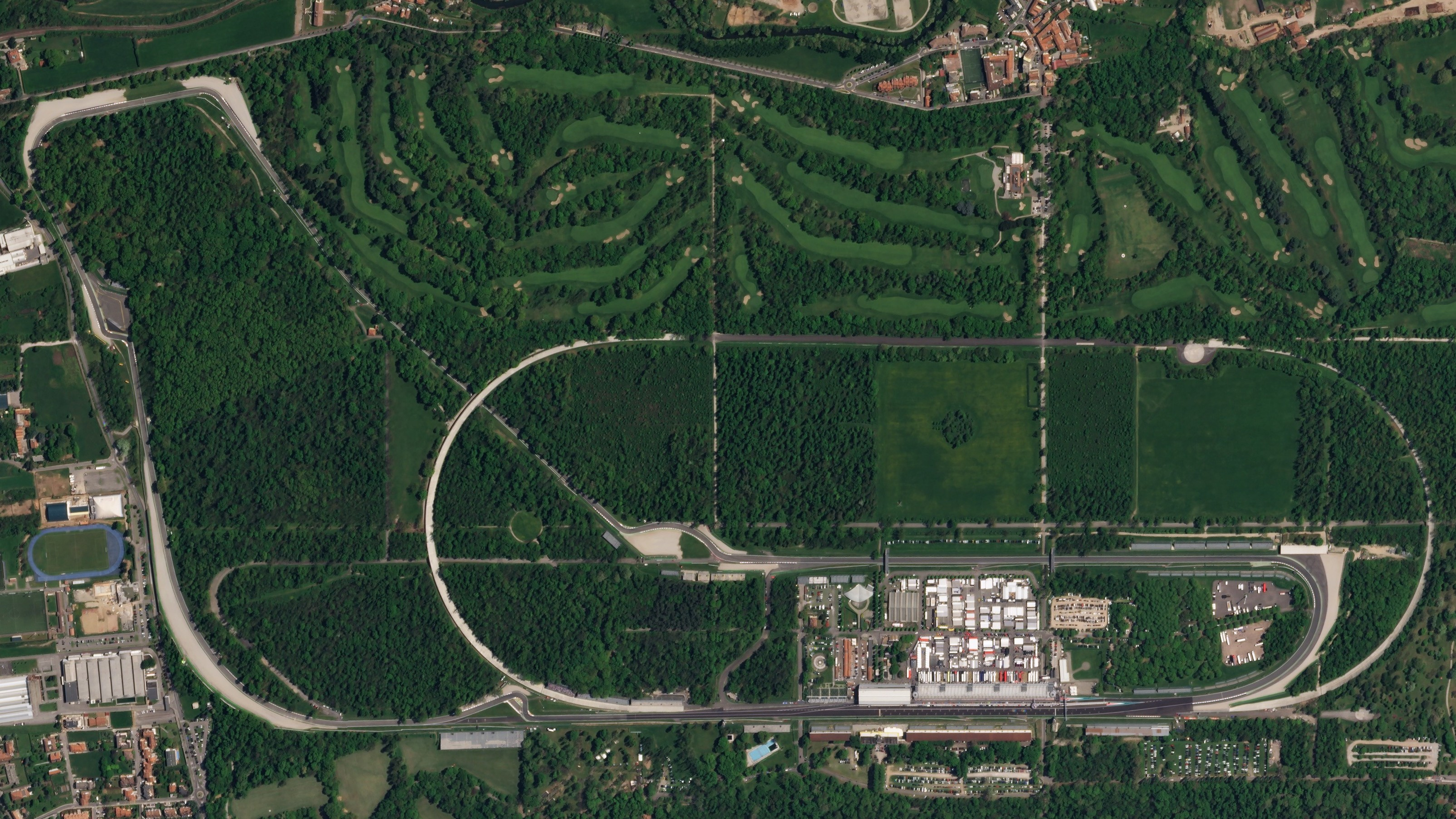
Satellite view of the Monza Circuit

Milan hosted matches at the FIFA World Cup in 1934 and 1990, the UEFA European Championship in 1980, and more recently held the 2003 World Rowing Championships, the 2009 World Boxing Championships, and some games of the Men's Volleyball World Championship in 2010, as well as the final games of the Women's Volleyball World Championship in 2014. In 2018, Milan hosted the World Figure Skating Championships. Milan also hosted the 2026 Winter Olympics as well as the 2026 Winter Paralympics jointly with Cortina d'Ampezzo.

Milan, along with Manchester, is one of only two cities in Europe that is home to two European Cup/Champions League winning teams: Serie A football clubs AC Milan and Inter. They are two of the most successful clubs in the world of football in terms of international trophies. Both teams have also won the FIFA Club World Cup (formerly the Intercontinental Cup). With a combined ten Champions League titles, Milan is only second to Madrid as the city with the most European Cups. Both teams play at the UEFA 5-star-rated Giuseppe Meazza Stadium, more commonly known as the San Siro, that is one of the biggest stadiums in Europe, with a seating capacity of over 80,000. The Meazza Stadium has hosted four European Cup/Champions League finals, most recently in 2016, when Real Madrid defeated Atlético Madrid 5–3 in a penalty shoot-out. A third team, Brera Calcio, plays in Prima Categoria, the seventh tier of Italian football. Another team, Milano City FC (a successor of Bustese Calcio), plays in Serie D, the fourth level.

Milan was one of the host cities of the EuroBasket 2022. There are currently four professional Lega Basket clubs in Milan: Olimpia Milano, Pallacanestro Milano 1958, Società Canottieri Milano and A.S.S.I. Milano. Olimpia is the most decorated basketball club in Italy, having won 31 Italian League championships, eight Italian National Cups, five Italian Super Cups, three European Champions Cups, one FIBA Intercontinental Cup, three FIBA Saporta Cups, two FIBA Korać Cups and many junior titles. The team play at the Mediolanum Forum, with a capacity of 12,700, where it has been hosted the final of the 2013–14 Euroleague. In some cases the team also plays at the PalaDesio, with a capacity of 6,700.

Milan is also home to Italy's oldest American football team: Rhinos Milano, who have won five Italian Super Bowls. The team plays at the Velodromo Vigorelli, with a capacity of 8,000. Another American football team that use the same venue is the Seamen Milano, who joined the professional European League of Football in 2023. Milan also has two cricket teams: Milano Fiori, currently competing in the second division, and Kingsgrove Milan, who won the Serie A championship in 2014. Amatori Rugby Milano, the most decorated rugby team in Italy, was founded in Milan in 1927. The Monza Circuit, located near Milan, hosts the Formula One Italian Grand Prix. The circuit is located inside the Royal Villa of Monza park. It is one of the world's oldest car racing circuits. The capacity for the Formula One races is currently over 113,000. It has hosted a Formula One race nearly every year since the first year of competition, with the exception of 1980.

In road cycling, Milan hosts the start of the annual Milan–San Remo classic one-day race and the annual Milano–Torino one day race. Milan is also the traditional finish for the final stage of the Giro d'Italia, which, along with the Tour de France and the Vuelta a España, is one of cycling's three Grand Tours.

== International relations ==
=== Twin towns – sister cities ===
Milan is twinned with:

- São Paulo, Brazil, since 1961
- Chicago, United States, since 1962
- Lyon, France, since 1967
- Saint Petersburg, Russia, since 1967
- Frankfurt, Germany, since 1969
- Birmingham, United Kingdom, since 1974
- Dakar, Senegal, since 1974
- Shanghai, China, since 1979
- Osaka, Japan, since 1981
- Tel Aviv, Israel, since 1997
- Bethlehem, Palestine, since 2000
- Toronto, Canada, since 2003
- Kraków, Poland, since 2003
- Melbourne, Australia, since 2004
- Daegu, South Korea, since 2015

The partnership with Saint Petersburg was suspended in 2012 (a decision taken by the city of Milan), because of the prohibition of the Russian government on "homosexual propaganda". However, it was later restored and as of 2022, St. Petersburg is still listed on Milan's official list of twin towns.

== Notable people ==
=== Honorary citizens ===
People awarded the honorary citizenship of Milan include:

Date	Name	Notes
24 February 1972	Charlie Chaplin (1889–1977)	English comic actor
March 1980	Andrei Sakharov (1921–1989)	Russian nuclear physicist, dissident and activist
December 1988	Alexander Dubček (1921–1992)	Czechoslovak and Slovak politician and dissident
16 February 1990	Paola Borboni (1900–1995)	Italian actress
21 October 2004	Rudy Giuliani (born 1944)	American politician, former mayor of New York City, and attorney of Donald Trump
3 September 2005	Rania Al-Abdullah (born 1970)	Queen consort of Jordan
10 December 2008	Al Gore (born 1948)	American politician and former Vice President of the United States
18 January 2012	Roberto Saviano (born 1979)	Italian journalist and writer
4 April 2016	Nino Di Matteo (born 1961)	Italian magistrate
20 October 2016	Dalai Lama (born 1935)	Tibetan Buddhist spiritual leader
10 December 2020	Patrick Zaki (born 1991)	Egyptian student

== See also ==
- Biscione
- History of architecture and art in Milan
- List of cities in the European Union by population within city limits
- Outline of Italy
- Outline of Milan

== Bibliography ==
- Beneventi, Pietro. Anselmo, Conte di Rosate. Istoria milanese al tempo del Barbarossa. Europia.
- Brown, Horatio Robert Forbes; Ashby, Thomas (1911). "Milan" . Encyclopædia Britannica. Vol. 18 (11th ed.). pp. 437–441.
- Gibbon, Edward. The History of the Decline and Fall of the Roman Empire.
- Jones, A.H.M. (1964). The Later Roman Empire, 284–602: A Social, Economic, and Administrative Survey. Norman, Oklahoma: University of Oklahoma Press.
- Mirabella Roberti, Mario (1984). Milano romana. Rusconi.
- Marchesi. I percorsi della Storia. Minerva Italica.
- Milano tra l'età repubblicana e l'età augustea: atti del Convegno di studi – Milano 26–27 Marzo 1999. Milan: Grafiche Serenissima.
- Milano capitale dell'impero romano: 286–402 d.C. Milan: Silvana. 1990.
- Sena Chiesa; Gemma Arslan; Ermanno A. Acts of international convention "Milan Capital", Convegno archeologico internazionale Milano capitale dell'impero romano 1990. Milan.
- Sordi, Marta; et al. (22–24 April 1987). Agostino a Milano: il battesimo – Agostino nelle terre di Ambrogio. Augustinus.
- Torri, Monica (23 January 2007). Milan & The Lakes. DK Publishing (Dorling Kindersley). ISBN 978-0-7566-2443-9.
- Welch, Evelyn S (1995). Art and authority in Renaissance Milan. Yale University Press, New Haven, Connecticut. ISBN 978-0-300-06351-6.
