= Palazzo Meroni =

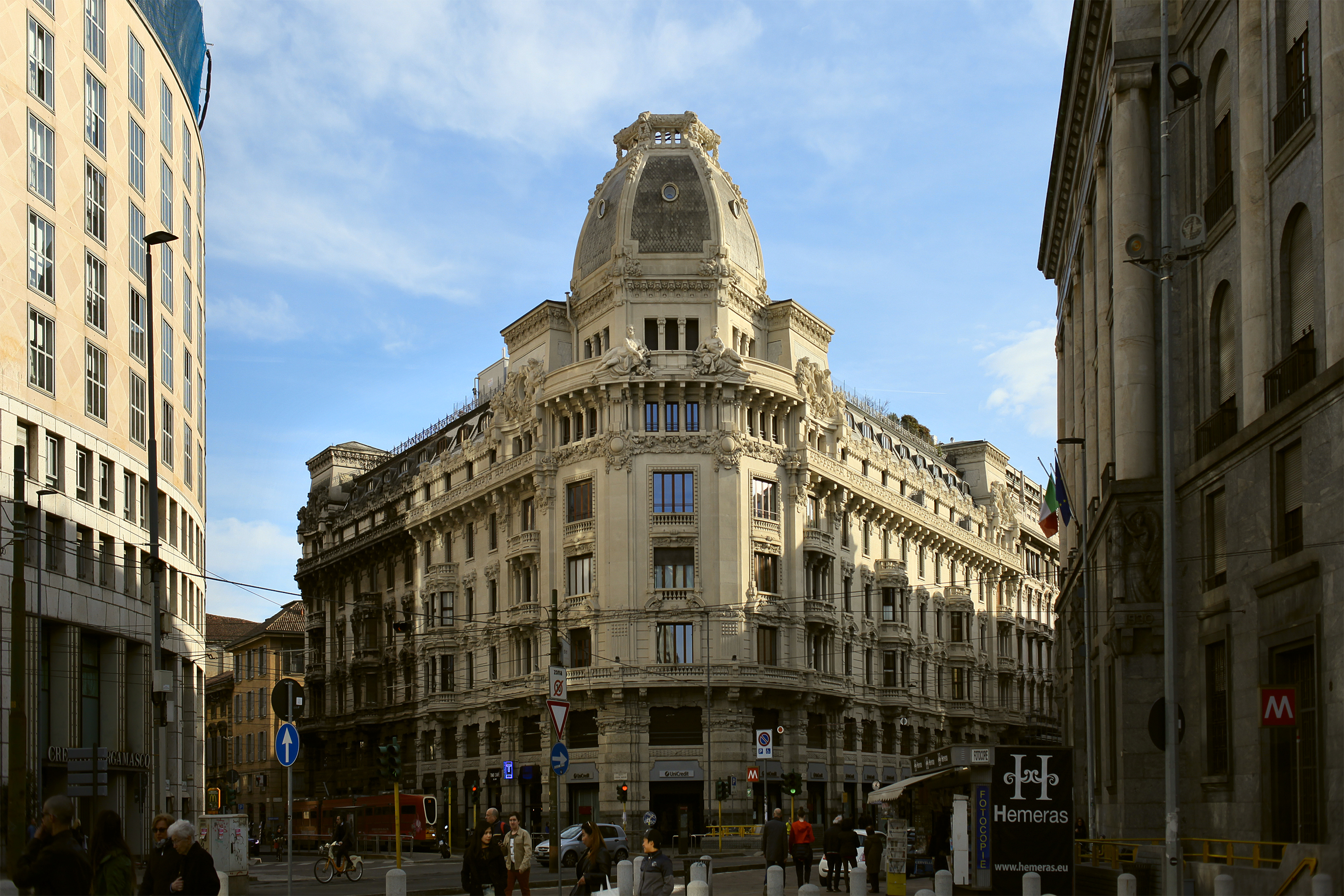
- Palazzo Meroni in Milan
- Click on the map for a fullscreen view

General information
- Architectural style: Eclectic
- Location: Milan, Italy
- Coordinates: 45°27′36″N 9°11′19″E

Design and construction
- Architect(s): Carlo Tenca; Cesare Penati

Palazzo Meroni is a historic building situated in Milan, Italy.

== History ==
The building was built in two phases. The first part of the building, designed by architect Carlo Tenca, was built from 1914 and 1924. The second part of the building, instead, was designed by Cesare Penati and completed in 1926.

== Description ==
The building occupies a triangular-shaped block delimited by the major thoroughfares of Corso Italia and Corso di Porta Romana and by the smaller Via Maddalena. It features an eclectic style with strong Art Nouveau and Beaux-Arts influences. The façades are characterized by rich and elaborate ornamentation. Moreover, the façade on Piazza Missori, at the intersection between Corso Italia and Corso di Porta Romana, is crowned by a large dome.

== Gallery ==
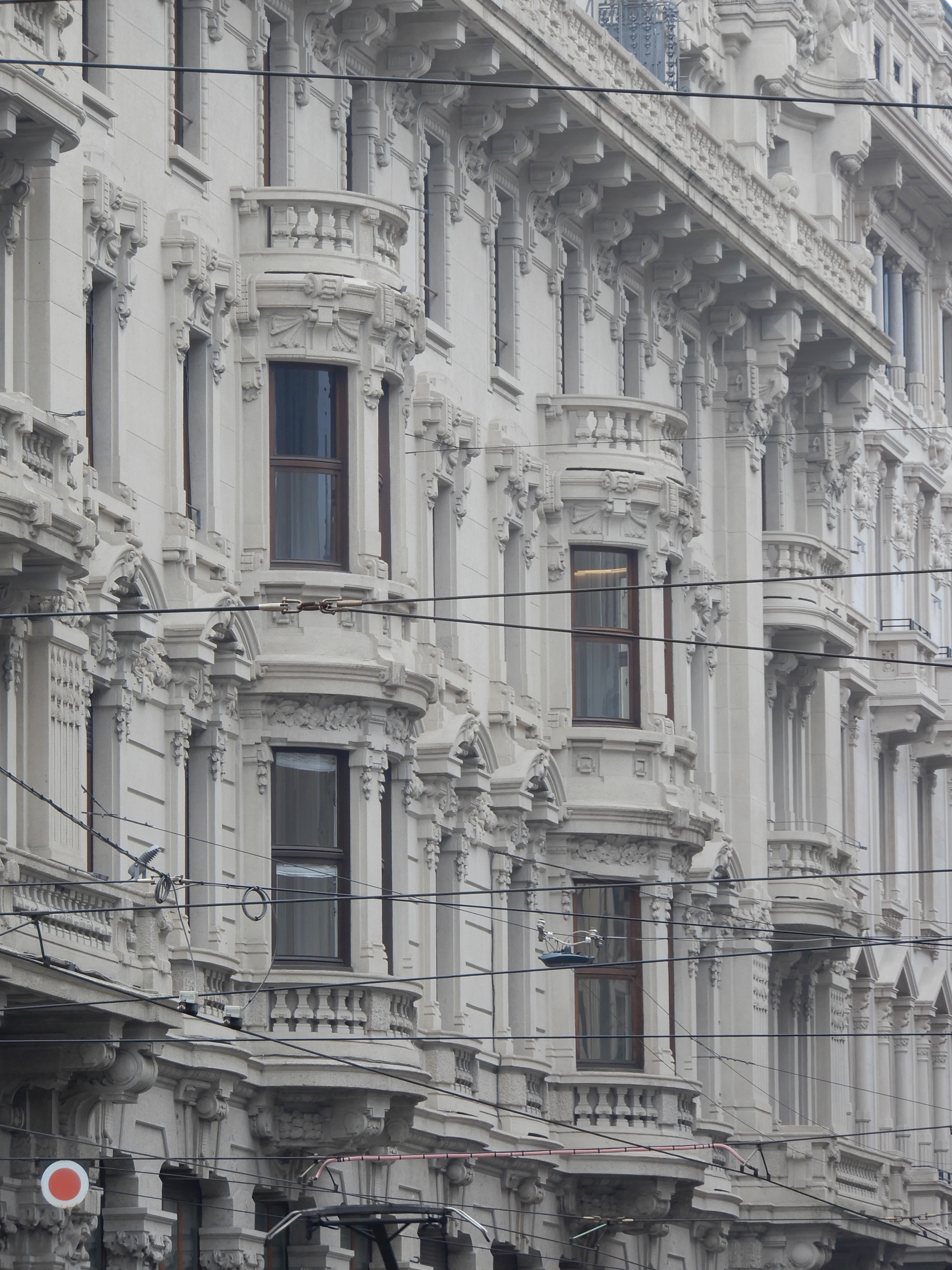

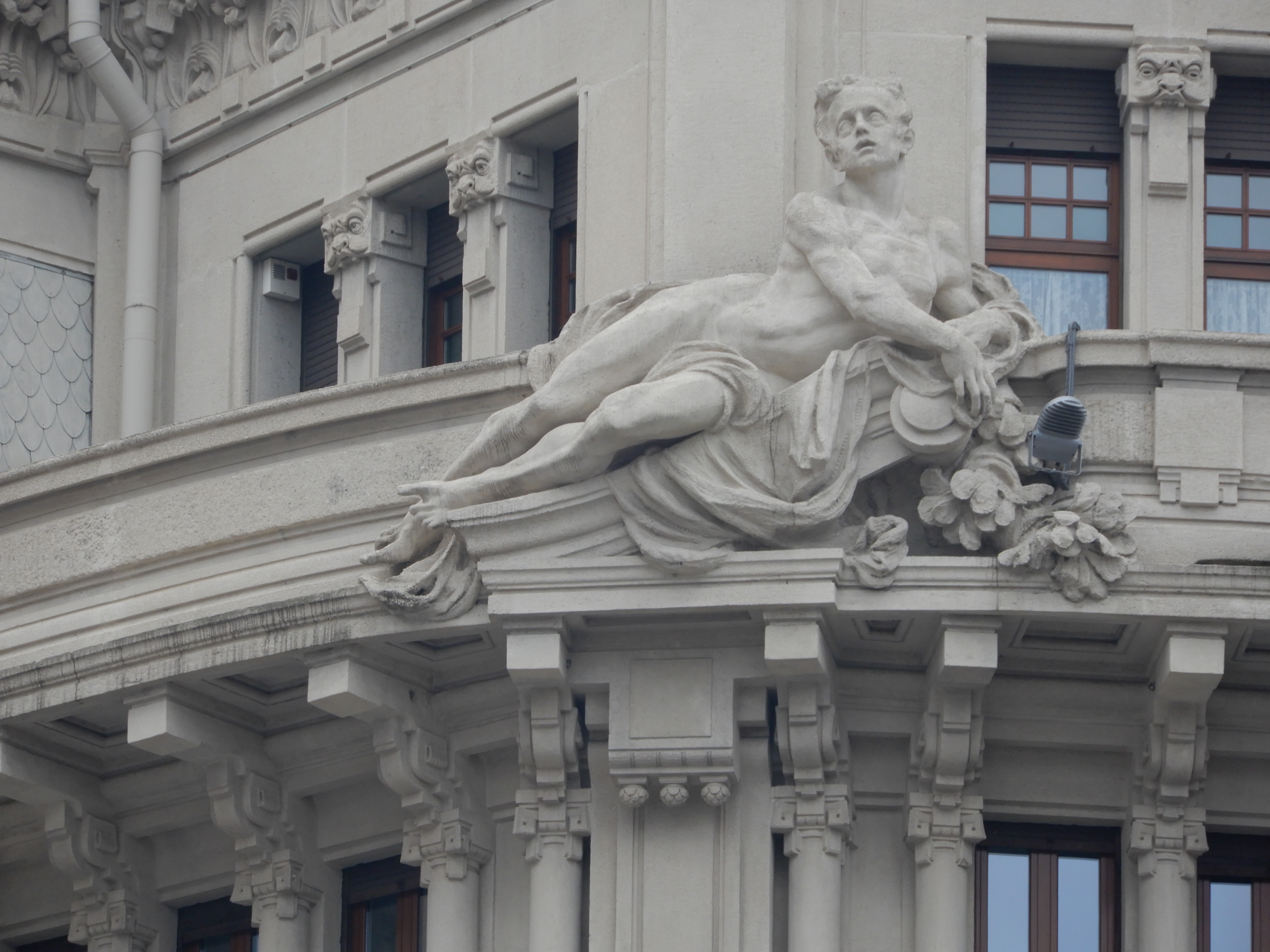

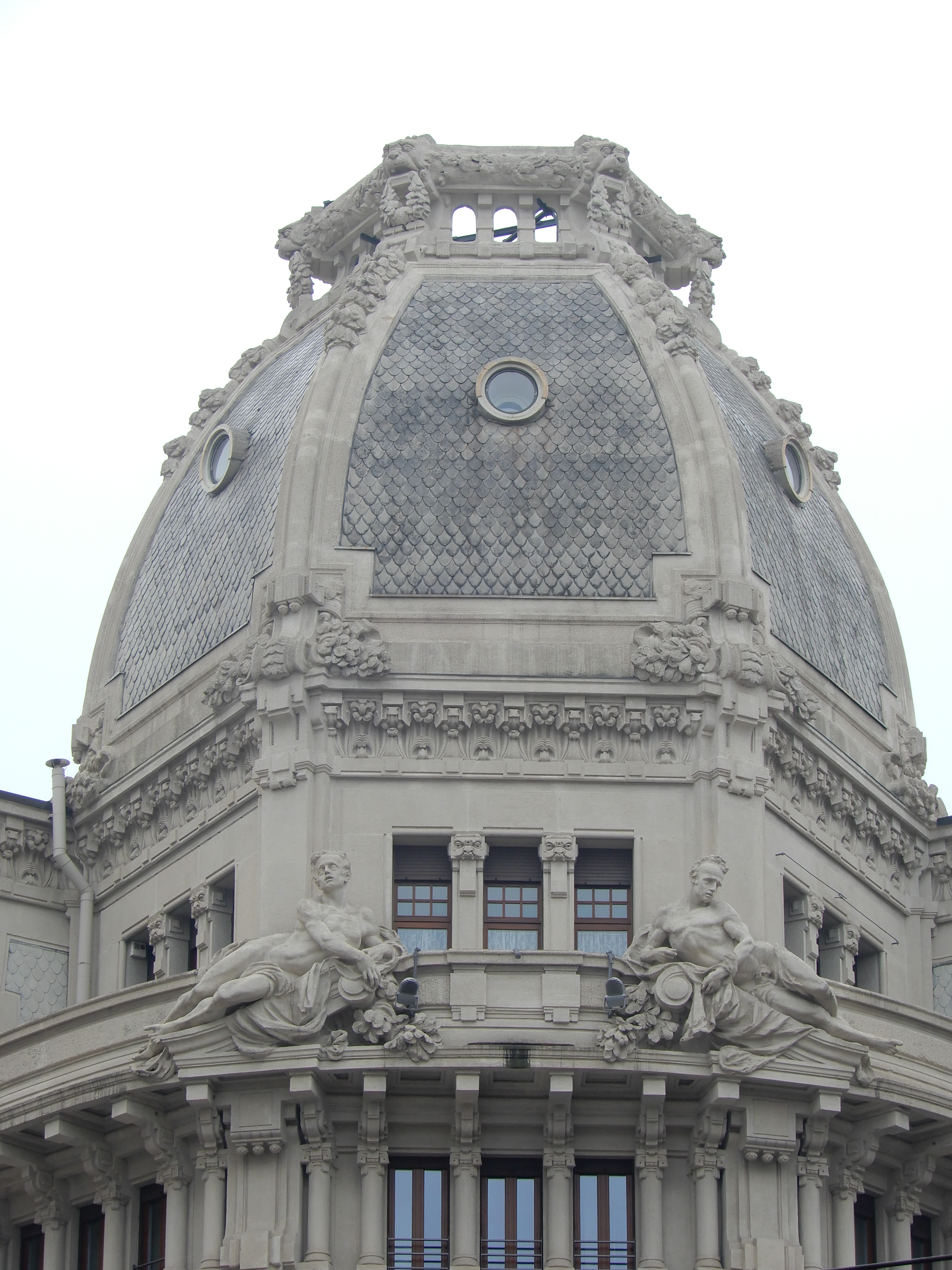
